= 2015–16 Irish Cup =

Tournament details
- Country: Northern Ireland
- Teams: 129

Final positions
- Champions: Glenavon (7th win)
- Runners-up: Linfield

Tournament statistics
- Matches played: 127
- Goals scored: 553 (4.35 per match)

The 2015–16 Irish Cup (known as the Tennent's Irish Cup for sponsorship purposes) was the 136th edition of the Irish Cup, the premier knockout cup competition in Northern Irish football since its introduction in 1881. The competition began on 18 August 2015 with the first round and concluded with the final at Windsor Park on 7 May 2016. The cup was sponsored by Tennent's Lager, the competition's first title sponsor since 2012.

Glentoran were the defending champions, after they lifted the cup for the second time in three seasons and for the 22nd time overall by defeating Portadown 1–0 in the 2015 final. Their defence of the Cup ended in the sixth round after falling to a 4–1 home defeat against 2013–14 winners, Glenavon.

Glenavon who were the eventual winners after beating Linfield 2-0 in the final, qualified for the 2016–17 UEFA Europa League first qualifying round

== Format and schedule ==
129 clubs entered this season's competition, an increase of four clubs compared with the 2014–15 total of 125 clubs. 82 regional league clubs from tiers 4–7 in the Northern Ireland football league system entered the competition in the first round, with a further seven clubs receiving byes to proceed directly into the second round as necessitated by the number of participants. These clubs contested the first three rounds, with the 12 surviving clubs joining the 28 NIFL Championship clubs in the fourth round. The 12 NIFL Premiership clubs enter the competition in the fifth round, along with the 20 winners from the fourth round matches. All ties level after 90 minutes used extra time to determine the winner, with a penalty shoot-out to follow if necessary.

Round	Draw date	First match date	Fixtures	Clubs
First round	22 July 2015	18 August 2015	41	129 → 88
Second round	25 August 2015	3 October 2015	24	88 → 64
Third round	13 October 2015	7 November 2015	12	64 → 52
Fourth round	10 November 2015	5 December 2015	20	52 → 32
Fifth round	8 December 2015	9 January 2016	16	32 → 16
Sixth round	9 January 2016	6 February 2016	8	16 → 8
Quarter-finals	6 February 2016	5 March 2016	4	8 → 4
Semi-finals	5 March 2016	1 April 2016	2	4 → 2
Final		7 May 2016	1	2 → 1

Tiers	Leagues	No. of Entries	Entry round
1	NIFL Premiership	12	Fifth round
2	NIFL Championship 1	28	Fourth round
3	NIFL Championship 2	28	Fourth round
4	Ballymena & Provincial Football League Premier Division; Mid-Ulster Football League Intermediate A Northern Amateur Football League Premier Division; Northern Ireland Intermediate League	89	First round (Second round if byed)
5	Mid-Ulster Football League Intermediate B Northern Amateur Football League Division 1A	89	First round (Second round if byed)
6	Northern Amateur Football League Division 1B	89	First round (Second round if byed)
7	Northern Amateur Football League Division 1C	89	First round (Second round if byed)

== Results ==
Note: The league tier of each club at the time of entering the competition is listed in parentheses.

=== First round ===
The draw for the first round was made on 22 July 2015 with the matches played between 18 and 22 August 2015.

Seven clubs received byes into the second round, namely: Downpatrick (4), Dunmurry Recreation (5), Groomsport (7), Larne Tech Old Boys (5), Oxford United Stars (4), Rathfriland Rangers (5) and Seagoe (5).

Note: All entrants at this stage were at regional level (tiers 4–7).

Team 1	Score	Team 2
18 August 2015
Newcastle (6)	3–2	Ballynahinch Olympic (6)
20 August 2015
Drumaness Mills (4)	1–4	Dunloy (4)
21 August 2015
Ballynure Old Boys (4)	1–2	Sirocco Works (6)
22 August 2015
Abbey Villa (5)	4–1	UUJ (6)
Ardstraw (4)	1–5	Newry City (4)
Ballynahinch United (6)	2–4	Valley Rangers (4)
Ballywalter Recreation (6)	4–2	Iveagh United (7)
Bloomfield (6)	1–4	Desertmartin (4)
Chimney Corner (4)	3–3 (aet) (3–4 p)	Downshire Young Men (7)
Comber Recreation (5)	3–0	Windmill Stars (5)
Craigavon City (5)	3–4	Lower Maze (4)
Crumlin Star (4)	3–0	Shorts (7)
Crumlin United (4)	3–2	Nortel (4)
Derriaghy Cricket Club (4)	4–1	Orangefield Old Boys (5)
Donard Hospital (6)	2–4	Shankill United (4)
Dromara Village (5)	2–1	Colin Valley (6)
Dromore Amateurs (7)	0–3	Lisburn Rangers (5)
Dundonald (5)	3–2	Broomhill (4)
Dungiven Celtic (4)	1–5	Newtowne (4)
Dunmurry Young Men (7)	8–1	Laurelvale (5)
East Belfast (5)	1–2	Ards Rangers (4)
Fivemiletown United (4)	2–3	St Mary's (4)
Grove United (6)	0–1	Malachians (4)
Hanover (4)	5–1	Ballymoney United (4)
Immaculata (4)	2–1	1st Bangor Old Boys (5)
Killyleagh Youth (5)	3–2	Bryansburn Rangers (7)
Lurgan Town (5)	0–1	Wellington Recreation (6)
Magherafelt Sky Blues (4)	1–2	Brantwood (4)
Moneyslane (5)	2–1	Barn United (5)
Mossley (7)	1–3	18th Newtownabbey Old Boys (7)
Newbuildings United (4)	2–3	Crewe United (4)
Oxford Sunnyside (5)	2–7	Rosario YC (6)
Portaferry Rovers (6)	0–3	Banbridge Rangers (4)
Rathcoole (4)	3–2	Ballymacash Rangers (4)
Rathfern Rangers (6)	4–2	Richhill (5)
Saintfield United (7)	1–2	Ardglass (4)
Seapatrick (4)	1–0	Killymoon Rangers (4)
St Patrick's Young Men (5)	2–1	Markethill Swifts (5)
Strabane Athletic (4)	11–0	Kilmore Recreation (4)
Tandragee Rovers (4)	1–0	Albert Foundry (4)
Trojans (4)	2–1	Islandmagee (4)

Source: irishfa.com

=== Second round ===
48 clubs competed in the second round; the 41 winners from the first round matches, along with the seven clubs that received byes. The draw took place on 25 August 2015, with the matches played on 3 October 2015.

Note: All entrants at this stage were at regional level (tiers 4–7).

Team 1	Score	Team 2
18th Newtownabbey Old Boys (7)	1–3	Abbey Villa (5)
Ardglass (4)	3–1	Killyleagh Youth (5)
Ards Rangers (4)	4–1	Strabane Athletic (4)
Ballywalter Recreation (6)	0–4	Tandragee Rovers (4)
Banbridge Rangers (4)	2–0	Seapatrick (4)
Brantwood (4)	2–3	Sirocco Works (6)
Crumlin Star (4)	2–1	Newry City (4)
Crumlin United (4)	9–1	Seagoe (5)
Derriaghy Cricket Club (4)	1–6	Trojans (4)
Desertmartin (4)	1–2	Lisburn Rangers (5)
Downshire Young Men (7)	4–2	Moneyslane (5)
Dromara Village (5)	2–1	Newcastle (6)
Dunloy (4)	2–10	Dundonald (5)
Dunmurry Recreation (5)	5–3	Hanover (4)
Groomsport (7)	1–4	Newtowne (4)
Immaculata (4)	10–0	Dunmurry Young Men (7)
Larne Tech Old Boys (5)	2–2 (aet) (4–5 p)	Oxford United Stars (4)
Malachians (4)	0–1	Comber Recreation (5)
Rathcoole (4)	1–2	Lower Maze (4)
Rathfriland Rangers (5)	1–0	Crewe United (4)
St Mary's (4)	3–1	Downpatrick (4)
St Patrick's Young Men (5)	4–1	Shankill United (4)
Valley Rangers (4)	3–1	Rathfern Rangers (6)
Wellington Recreation (6)	2–1	Rosario YC (6)

Source: irishfa.com

=== Third round ===
The 24 winners from the second round entered this round. The draw took place on 13 October 2015, with the fixtures played on 7 November 2015. As the only tier 7 club remaining, Downshire Young Men were the lowest-ranked side to reach this stage of the competition, but were ultimately knocked out after a narrow 3–2 defeat to Crumlin United.

Note: All entrants at this stage were at regional level (tiers 4–7).

Team 1	Score	Team 2
Abbey Villa (5)	1–1 (aet) (4–2 p)	Dunmurry Recreation (5)
Ards Rangers (4)	4–1	St Mary's (4)
Comber Recreation (5)	3–4	Ardglass (4)
Crumlin Star (4)	5–0	Dundonald (5)
Downshire Young Men (7)	2–3	Crumlin United (4)
Immaculata (4)	4–2	Lower Maze (4)
Lisburn Rangers (5)	3–0	Tandragee Rovers (4)
Newtowne (4)	3–2	Dromara Village (5)
Oxford United Stars (4)	1–0	St Patrick's Young Men (5)
Rathfriland Rangers (5)	4–2	Sirocco Works (6)
Trojans (4)	5–1	Banbridge Rangers (4)
Valley Rangers (4)	0–2	Wellington Recreation (6)

Source: irishfa.com

=== Fourth round ===
The fourth round draw was completed on 10 November 2015, with the matches completed between 5 December 2015 and 2 January 2016. The 28 NIFL Championship clubs entered the competition at this stage, and were joined by the 12 third round winners. As the only tier 6 club remaining, Wellington Recreation were the lowest-ranked side to reach this stage of the competition, but they were eliminated by Harland & Wolff Welders.

Note: Intermediate clubs entered the competition at this stage (tiers 2–3).

Team 1	Score	Team 2
5 December 2015
Annagh United (2)	2–1	Dollingstown (3)
Ards (2)	7–0	Donegal Celtic (2)
Ards Rangers (4)	2–3	Oxford United Stars (4)
Armagh City (2)	3–0	Lisburn Rangers (5)
Ballyclare Comrades (2)	0–1	Crumlin Star (4)
Banbridge Town (3)	3–3 (aet) (3–2 p)	Crumlin United (4)
Dundela (3)	0–2	Immaculata (4)
Harland & Wolff Welders (2)	3–2	Wellington Recreation (6)
Loughgall (2)	2–1	Trojans (4)
Lurgan Celtic (2)	4–0	Ardglass (4)
Newington YC (3)	1–2 (aet)	PSNI (3)
Queen's University (3)	1–2	Tobermore United (3)
Wakehurst (3)	1–1 (aet) (3–2 p)	Glebe Rangers (3)
8 December 2015
Bangor (2)	5–0	Coagh United (3)
9 December 2015
Institute (2)	1–1 (aet) (5–4 p)	Newtowne (4)
19 December 2015
Dergview (2)	1–6	Sport & Leisure Swifts (3)
Larne (2)	2–0	Limavady United (3)
Lisburn Distillery (2)	2–3 (aet)	Knockbreda (2)
Portstewart (3)	3–1	Moyola Park (3)
2 January 2016
Abbey Villa (5)	0–4	Rathfriland Rangers (5)

=== Fifth round ===
The fifth round draw took place on 8 December 2015, with the matches completed on 9 and 19 January 2016. The 20 winners from the fourth round matches joined the 12 NIFL Premiership clubs to make up the final 32 clubs. As the sole remaining club from tier 5, Rathfriland Rangers were the lowest ranked side to reach the fifth round, but were eliminated by Crusaders.

Note: Senior clubs entered the competition at this stage (tier 1).

9 January 2016	Banbridge Town (3)	0–2	Carrick Rangers (1)	Crystal Park, Banbridge
13:30 GMT		BBC Sport	Chines 4'; Kelly 53'

9 January 2016	Crumlin Star (4)	3–2	Oxford United Stars (4)	The Cliff, Larne
13:30 GMT	Murphy 60', 67'; Brown 89'	BBC Sport	Curran 72', 79'

9 January 2016	Harland & Wolff Welders (2)	1–4	Glenavon (1)	Tillysburn Park, Belfast
13:30 GMT	Davidson 66'	BBC Sport	Hall 20'; Bradley 63', 81'; Cooper 90+1'

9 January 2016	Loughgall (2)	5–2	Larne (2)	Lakeview Park, Loughgall
13:30 GMT	Walsh 16'; Mullan 22', 44'; Rea 28'; Ryan 53'	BBC Sport	Robinson 15'; Keke 57'

9 January 2016	Lurgan Celtic (2)	2–1	Bangor (2)	Knockrammer Park, Lurgan
13:30 GMT	Barton 19'; Haire 65'	BBC Sport	Walsh 58'

9 January 2016	Sport & Leisure Swifts (3)	3–2 (a.e.t.)	Institute (2)	Glen Road Heights, Belfast
13:30 GMT	Glenholmes 52'; Gallagher 90+3'; Lynch 108' (pen.)	BBC Sport	Friel 25' (pen.); Harkin 43' (pen.)

9 January 2016	Tobermore United (3)	0–2	PSNI (3)	Fortwilliam Park, Tobermore
13:30 GMT		BBC Sport	Agnew 20'; Anderson 65'

9 January 2016	Armagh City (2)	2–2 (a.e.t.) (4–1 p)	Portstewart (3)	Holm Park, Armagh
15:00 GMT	Lavery 6'; Campbell 13'	BBC Sport	Bradley 67'; McClements 74'

9 January 2016	Cliftonville (1)	2–0	Immaculata (4)	Solitude, Belfast
15:00 GMT	Knowles 65'; Curran 75'	BBC Sport

9 January 2016	Coleraine (1)	2–2 (a.e.t.) (4–2 p)	Ballinamallard United (1)	The Showgrounds, Coleraine
15:00 GMT	Douglas 85'; Harkin 90+3'	BBC Sport	Campbell 16'; Lecky 33'

9 January 2016	Crusaders (1)	3–0	Rathfriland Rangers (5)	Seaview, Belfast
15:00 GMT	O'Carroll 33'; Owens 48'; Forsythe 60'	BBC Sport

9 January 2016	Dungannon Swifts (1)	4–3	Warrenpoint Town (1)	Stangmore Park, Dungannon
15:00 GMT	Teggart 24'; Mitchell 31', 71'; Mullan 38'	BBC Sport	M Hughes 59'; Murray 85'; McMurray 90+2'

9 January 2016	Linfield (1)	2–1 (a.e.t.)	Ballymena United (1)	Windsor Park, Belfast
15:00 GMT	Waterworth 47'; Bates 114'	BBC Sport	Thompson 64'

9 January 2016	Portadown (1)	6–1	Wakehurst (3)	Shamrock Park, Portadown
15:00 GMT	McAllister 15', 22', 57'; Casement 42'; Mouncey 51'; Parker 83'	BBC Sport	Loughlin 90'

19 January 2016	Annagh United (2)	1–5	Knockbreda (2)	Tandragee Road, Portadown
19:45 GMT	McCordick 3'	BBC Sport	Wilson 16', 40'; Johnston 36'; Beggs 61', 77'

19 January 2016	Glentoran (1)	4–1	Ards (2)	The Oval, Belfast
19:45 GMT	Lavery 19', 24', 90+2'; Magee 46'	BBC Sport	Gage 44'

=== Sixth round ===
The sixth round draw was made on 9 January 2016, with the matches played on 6 and 15 February 2016. The 16 winners from the fifth round matches entered this round. As the only representative from outside the Northern Ireland Football League, Crumlin Star were the lowest-ranked club to reach this stage of the competition, but they were eliminated after a narrow 1–0 defeat against Carrick Rangers.

6 February 2016	Loughgall (2)	2–0	PSNI (3)	Lakeview Park, Loughgall
13:30 GMT	Mullen 31', 58' (pen.)	BBC Sport

6 February 2016	Lurgan Celtic (2)	1–0	Knockbreda (2)	Knockrammer Park, Lurgan
13:30 GMT	Haire 79'	BBC Sport

6 February 2016	Cliftonville (1)	4–0	Sport & Leisure Swifts (3)	Solitude, Belfast
15:00 GMT	J.Donnelly 7', 9', 86' (pen.); Catney 79'	BBC Sport

6 February 2016	Dungannon Swifts (1)	1–3	Crusaders (1)	Stangmore Park, Dungannon
15:00 GMT	Burke 29'	BBC Sport	Mitchell 11'; Carvill 38'; Wilson 59' (o.g.)

6 February 2016	Glentoran (1)	1–4	Glenavon (1)	The Oval, Belfast
15:00 GMT	Lindsay 88' (o.g.)	BBC Sport	Marshall 10'; Martyn 17'; Bradley 54'; Cooper 90+2'

6 February 2016	Linfield (1)	7–0	Armagh City (2)	Windsor Park, Belfast
15:00 GMT	Waterworth 10', 27', 62', 65'; Burns 46', 75'; Fallon 87'	BBC Sport; Report

6 February 2016	Portadown (1)	3–1	Coleraine (1)	Shamrock Park, Portadown
15:00 GMT	Oman 31'; Twigg 60' (pen.); Lowry 87'	BBC Sport	McLaughlin 43'

15 February 2016	Carrick Rangers (1)	1–0	Crumlin Star (4)	Seaview, Belfast
19:45 GMT	Chines 63' (pen.)	BBC Sport

=== Quarter-finals ===
The 8 winners of the sixth round matches entered the quarter-finals. The draw took place on 6 February 2016, with the matches played on 5 March 2016. As the only two representatives from outside the NIFL Premiership, second tier sides Loughgall and Lurgan Celtic were the lowest-ranked clubs to reach the quarter-finals. It was Lurgan Celtic's first ever appearance in the quarter-finals. Most notably, this round of matches saw Ronnie McFall's reign as Portadown manager come to an end after 29 years. Appointed in December 1986, he was at the time the longest-serving manager in European football, and resigned after his side's shock 3–2 home defeat against Lurgan Celtic.

5 March 2016	Crusaders (1)	3–0	Carrick Rangers (1)	Seaview, Belfast
15:00 GMT	Heatley 16', 52'; O'Carroll 33'	BBC Sport		Referee: Raymond Crangle

5 March 2016	Cliftonville (1)	0–3	Linfield (1)	Solitude, Belfast
15:00 GMT		BBC Sport	Gaynor 56', 90' (pen.); Waterworth 76'	Referee: Andrew Davey

5 March 2016	Glenavon (1)	2–1	Loughgall (2)	Mourneview Park, Lurgan
15:00 GMT	O'Brien 40'; McGrory 66' (pen.)	BBC Sport	Mallon 67'	Referee: Arnold Hunter

5 March 2016	Portadown (1)	2–3	Lurgan Celtic (2)	Shamrock Park, Portadown
15:00 GMT	Soares 58'; Mackle 70'	BBC Sport	Haire 13'; Conaty 54'; Fitzpatrick 90' (pen.)	Referee: Raymond Hetherington

=== Semi-finals ===
The 4 quarter-final winners entered the semi-finals, with the matches played at Windsor Park on 1 and 2 April 2016. The dates for the matches were switched after the draw, following a request from the PSNI. As the only representative from outside the NIFL Premiership remaining, second tier side Lurgan Celtic were the lowest-ranked club to reach the semi-finals. It was their first ever appearance in the semi-finals, but they were eliminated by Linfield.

1 April 2016
19:45 BST (GMT+1)

Glenavon (1)	4–3	Crusaders (1)
Braniff 27', 43', 53', 72'	Report	Snoddy 24', 28'; Heatley 47'

Windsor Park, Belfast

2 April 2016
15:00 BST (GMT+1)

Linfield (1)	3–0	Lurgan Celtic (2)
Burns 60', 80', 90+2' (pen.)	Report

Windsor Park, Belfast

=== Final ===
The final was played on 7 May 2016 at Windsor Park. Linfield appeared in the final for a record 62nd time, the seventh time in eleven seasons, and the first time since winning a third consecutive cup in the 2012 final. Glenavon reached the final for the second time in three seasons after winning the cup in 2013–14. It was only the fourth ever meeting between the two sides in the final, and the first since the 1992 final when Glenavon defeated Linfield 2–1 at the Oval to win the cup for the fourth time. History would repeat itself as Glenavon went on to beat Linfield 2-0 to win the cup for the seventh time and the second time in three seasons

7 May 2016
14:30 BST (GMT+1)

Glenavon (1)	2–0	Linfield (1)
Braniff 45'; Hall 48'	Report

Windsor Park, Belfast
Attendance: 11,500
Referee: Raymond Heatherington
