= 2013–14 Irish Cup =

Tournament details
- Country: Northern Ireland
- Teams: 119

Final positions
- Champions: Glenavon (6th win)
- Runners-up: Ballymena United

Tournament statistics
- Matches played: 124
- Goals scored: 488 (3.94 per match)

The 2013–14 Irish Cup was the 134th edition of the Irish Cup, the premier knockout cup competition in Northern Irish football since its introduction in 1881. The competition began on 7 September 2013 with the first round and ended on 3 May 2014 with the final. The competition ran without a principal sponsor, but for the second successive season the final was known as the Marie Curie Irish Cup final, after the IFA once again awarded the naming rights for the final to the charity Marie Curie Cancer Care.

Glentoran were the defending champions, following their 3–1 win over Cliftonville after extra time in the 2012–13 final. However, they were eliminated in the quarter-finals by eventual winners Glenavon who defeated Ballymena United 2–1 in the final to lift the cup for the sixth time. As a result, Glenavon qualified for the 2014–15 UEFA Europa League first qualifying round.

== Format and schedule ==
119 clubs entered this season's competition, the same number that had taken part the previous season. Originally there had been 122 entrants, but three clubs later withdrew from the competition before the first round matches had been played.

Regional league clubs from level 4 and below on the Northern Ireland football league system entered in the first round and played against other regional league clubs in the first three rounds. Nine clubs were given a bye into the second round this season, necessitated by the number of participants. One of the clubs to receive a bye later withdrew. 29 of the 30 NIFL Championship clubs entered the competition, with Donegal Celtic being the only absentee. The 29 Championship clubs entered in the fourth round, along with the 11 lower league clubs that made it through the first three rounds.

The 12 NIFL Premiership clubs entered in the fifth round, along with the 20 winners from the fourth round matches. Replays were only used if a tie was level after 90 minutes in the fifth round, sixth round and quarter-finals. If a tie in any of these three rounds was still level after 90 minutes of the replay, extra time was used to determine the winner, with a penalty shoot-out to follow if necessary.

Round	Draw date	First match date	Fixtures		Clubs
Round	Draw date	First match date	Original	Replays	Clubs
First round	12 August 2013	7 September 2013	35		119 → 84
Second round	9 September 2013	12 October 2013	20†		84 → 63
Third round	22 October 2013	9 November 2013	11		63 → 52
Fourth round	11 November 2013	7 December 2013	20		52 → 32
Fifth round	16 December 2013	11 January 2014	16	5	32 → 16
Sixth round	11 January 2014	8 February 2014	8	2	16 → 8
Quarter-finals	8 February 2014	1 March 2014	4	0	8 → 4
Semi-finals	1 March 2014	5 April 2014	2		4 → 2
Final		3 May 2014	1		2 → 1

† One match was not played (walkover)

== Results ==
=== First round ===
The draw for the first round was made on 12 August 2013 with the matches played on 7 September 2013.

Ards Rangers, Albert Foundry, Ballywalter Recreation, Barn United, Dungiven Celtic, Oxford Sunnyside, Shorts and Strabane Athletic all received byes into the second round. Bangor Rangers, Holywood and Raceview were included in the original draw, but all three clubs withdrew before the first round matches were played. Bangor Rangers had received a bye, Holywood were drawn against Strabane Athletic, and Raceview were drawn against Ards Rangers. As a consequence, Ards Rangers and Strabane Athletic received byes, but Bangor Rangers' withdrawal meant that there would be an odd number of teams proceeding to the second round, necessitating a further bye at that stage.

Team 1	Score	Team 2
7 September 2013
18th Newtownabbey Old Boys	4–2	Lurgan Town
1st Bangor Old Boys	2–3	Newtowne
Ardstraw	0–1	Richhill
Bangor Amateurs	2–3	Ballynahinch United
Bangor Swifts	6–1	Groomsport
Bloomfield	0–1	Shankill United
Brantwood	2–3	Ardglass
Carniny Amateurs	2–0	Wellington Recreation
Comber Recreation	1–3	Kilmore Recreation
Crewe United	2–5	Dollingstown
Crumlin Star	3–0	Newcastle
Crumlin United	8–1	Draperstown Celtic
Derriaghy Cricket Club	6–2	Lower Maze
Donard Hospital	0–5	UUJ
Downpatrick	5–2	Saintfield United
Dromara Village	2–1	FC Ballynure
Dromore Amateurs	0–7	Banbridge Rangers
Drumaness Mills	6–0	Valley Rangers
Dunmurry Recreation	0–1	Newry City
Immaculata	3–1	Ballynure Old Boys
Islandmagee	3–2	St. Mary's
Iveagh United	2–4	Mountjoy United
Killyleagh Youth	1–0	Ballymacash Rangers
Lisanally Rangers	0–6	Newbuildings United
Lisburn Rangers	3–1	Dunmurry Young Men
Magherafelt Sky Blues	2–3	Camlough Rovers
Moneyslane	6–2	Kilroot Recreation
Mossley Young Men	1–4	Downshire Young Men
Nortel	5–3	Malachians
Rathfern Rangers	3–0	Broomhill
Rathfriland Rangers	2–1	Abbey Villa
Roe Rovers	1–2	Bryansburn Rangers
Seagoe	3–0	Tandragee Rovers
Sirocco Works	3–1	Larne Tech Old Boys
St Patrick's Young Men	2–2 (a.e.t.) (3–5 p)	Oxford United Stars

Source: irishfa.com

=== Second round ===
The draw for the second round was made on 9 September 2013, with the matches played on 12 October 2013. The 35 winners from the first round matches entered this round, along with the 8 clubs that received a bye. As there was an odd number of clubs in this round, one club, 18th Newtownabbey Old Boys, received a bye into the third round.

Team 1	Score	Team 2
12 October 2013
Albert Foundry	1–0^{1}	Shankill United
Ardglass	4–3	Banbridge Rangers
Ballynahinch United	0–1	Sirocco Works
Ballywalter Recreation	2–3	Rathfriland Rangers
Carniny Amateurs	1–0	Oxford United Stars
Crumlin Star	2–1	Dollingstown
Crumlin United	4–4 (a.e.t.) (3–2 p)	Islandmagee
Derriaghy Cricket Club	7–5	Ards Rangers
Downpatrick	5–0	UUJ
Downshire Young Men	1–0	Mountjoy United
Dromara Village	1–4	Kilmore Recreation
Dungiven Celtic	0–1	Newbuildings United
Immaculata	walkover†	Camlough Rovers
Lisburn Rangers	2–2 (a.e.t.) (3–2 p)	Barn United
Nortel	2–0	Moneyslane
Oxford Sunnyside	1–5	Drumaness Mills
Rathfern Rangers	3–1	Killyleagh Youth
Richhill	1–3	Newry City
Seagoe	0–2	Bryansburn Rangers
Shorts	0–3	Bangor Swifts
Strabane Athletic	6–2	Newtowne

Source: irishfa.com

†Immaculata won the tie by walkover. Camlough Rovers forfeited the match as they were unable to field a team to fulfil the fixture.

^{1}Albert Foundry were ejected from the competition for fielding an ineligible player during this match.

=== Third round ===
The third round draw was made on 22 October 2013, with the games played on 9 November 2013. The 21 winners from the second round matches entered this round, along with 18th Newtownabbey Old Boys who had received a bye in the second round. Albert Foundry were replaced with Shankill United, the team they had defeated 1–0 in the second round, after they were found to have fielded an ineligible player in that game.

Team 1	Score	Team 2
9 November 2013
Carniny Amateurs	3–5 (a.e.t.)	Ardglass
Derriaghy Cricket Club	3–0	18th Newtownabbey Old Boys
Downshire Young Men	2–2 (a.e.t.) (4–2 p)	Shankill United
Kilmore Recreation	0–0 (a.e.t.) (4–2 p)	Immaculata
Lisburn Rangers	3–1	Bryansburn Rangers
Newbuildings United	1–2	Crumlin Star
Newry City	0–0 (a.e.t.) (4–3 p)	Downpatrick
Nortel	0–2	Drumaness Mills
Rathfern Rangers	1–2	Sirocco Works
Rathfriland Rangers	4–1	Bangor Swifts
Strabane Athletic	2–0	Crumlin United

Source: irishfa.com

=== Fourth round ===
The fourth round draw was made on 11 November 2013, with the games played on 7 December 2013. The 11 winners from the third round matches entered this round, along with 29 of the 30 NIFL Championship clubs. Championship 1 side Donegal Celtic did not enter, which meant that there had to be eleven lower league clubs in this round to make up the requisite numbers, one more than the usual amount of ten.

Team 1	Score	Team 2
7 December 2013
Armagh City	2–0	Loughgall
Ballyclare Comrades	4–1	Larne
Banbridge Town	4–2	Rathfriland Rangers
Bangor	5–2	Knockbreda
Chimney Corner	3–0	Wakehurst
Coagh United	0–2 (a.e.t.)	Carrick Rangers
Crumlin Star	4–1	Newry City
Dergview	2–0	Drumaness Mills
Downshire Young Men	1–3	Kilmore Recreation
Glebe Rangers	3–2 (a.e.t.)	Ardglass
Harland & Wolff Welders	8–1	Killymoon Rangers
Institute	1–1 (a.e.t.) (4–5 p)	Lisburn Distillery
Limavady United	2–1	Derriaghy Cricket Club
Moyola Park	2–0	Annagh United
Newington	1–3	Ballymoney United
Portstewart	2–5	Dundela
PSNI	2–1	Tobermore United
Queen's University	5–0	Lurgan Celtic
Sport & Leisure Swifts	2–1	Sirocco Works
Strabane Athletic	2–0	Lisburn Rangers

Source: irishfa.com

=== Fifth round ===
The fifth round draw took place on 16 December 2013. The matches were played on 11 January 2014, and the replays were played on 21 January 2014. The 20 winners from the fourth round matches entered this round, along with the 12 NIFL Premiership clubs. Three regional league clubs made it through the first four rounds. This was the first round of the competition in which replays were used if a match ended level after 90 minutes.

11 January 2014	Harland & Wolff Welders	2 – 2	Ballymena United	Tillysburn Park, Belfast
13:30 GMT	Simpson 5'; Burrows 77'	Report	Kane 60'; Boyce 86'

11 January 2014	Queen's University	1 – 0	Limavady United	Upper Malone, Belfast
13:30 GMT	Hasson 75' (o.g.)	Report

11 January 2014	Lisburn Distillery	0 – 0	PSNI	New Grosvenor Stadium, Ballyskeagh
14:00 GMT		Report

11 January 2014	Armagh City	2 – 2	Ards	Holm Park, Armagh
15:00 GMT	Hinds 49'; Murray 52'	Report	Mitchell 45'; McMillen 90+5'

11 January 2014	Ballinamallard United	0 – 0	Strabane Athletic	Ferney Park, Ballinamallard
15:00 GMT		Report

11 January 2014	Ballyclare Comrades	3 – 0	Kilmore Recreation	Dixon Park, Ballyclare
15:00 GMT	McClurg 7' (pen.); Trussell 10'; Smith 13'	Report

11 January 2014	Ballymoney United	1 – 0	Banbridge Town	Riada Stadium, Ballymoney
15:00 GMT	McCaughan 35'	Report

11 January 2014	Bangor	7 – 1	Glebe Rangers	Clandeboye Park, Bangor
15:00 GMT	Lamb 21'; Cooling 29' (pen.), 58'; McDowell 49', 60'; Gardener 63'; Forsyth 85'	Report	Highlands 88' (o.g.)

11 January 2014	Carrick Rangers	3 – 2	Dundela	Inver Park, Larne
15:00 GMT	Lynch 50', 64'; Roy 87'	Report	McCain 38'; Beggs 71'

11 January 2014	Cliftonville	2 – 2	Coleraine	Solitude, Belfast
15:00 GMT	Gormley 27' (pen.); Boyce 47'	Report	Dooley 39'; McDaid 59'

11 January 2014	Crusaders	2 – 1	Crumlin Star	Seaview, Belfast
15:00 GMT	Snoddy 4' (pen.); Smith 73'	Report	Brown 61'

11 January 2014	Glenavon	7 – 0	Sport & Leisure Swifts	Mourneview Park, Lurgan
15:00 GMT	Shannon 4'; Marshall 7'; O'Neill 9' (o.g.); Rainey 40'; McIlveen 62'; McDaid 73'; Neill 85'	Report

11 January 2014	Linfield	5 – 0	Dergview	Windsor Park, Belfast
15:00 GMT	Liggett 21' (o.g.); Waterworth 42'; Burns 66', 70'; Lowry 77'	Report

11 January 2014	Moyola Park	1 – 5	Dungannon Swifts	Mill Meadow, Castledawson
15:00 GMT	Dowie 40'	Report	Liggett 7', 20'; Lavery 37'; Harpur 63' (pen.), 89' (pen.)

11 January 2014	Portadown	1 – 3	Glentoran	Shamrock Park, Portadown
15:00 GMT	Murray 27' (pen.)	Report	Boyd 19'; Allen 57', 90'

11 January 2014	Warrenpoint Town	2 – 0	Chimney Corner	Milltown, Warrenpoint
15:00 GMT	D. Hughes 2', 59'	Report

==== Replays ====
21 January 2014	PSNI	0 – 2	Lisburn Distillery	Newforge Lane, Belfast
13:30 GMT		Report	Wright 60'; Upton 79'

21 January 2014	Armagh City	3 – 1	Ards	Holm Park, Armagh
19:45 GMT	Murray 54', 84' (pen.); Lennon 60'	Report	Faulkner 12'

21 January 2014	Ballinamallard United	1 – 0	Strabane Athletic	Ferney Park, Ballinamallard
19:45 GMT	Campbell 20'	Report

21 January 2014	Ballymena United	1 – 0	Harland & Wolff Welders	The Showgrounds, Ballymena
19:45 GMT	Thompson 75'	Report

21 January 2014	Coleraine	4 – 3	Cliftonville	The Showgrounds, Coleraine
19:45 GMT	Owens 11'; Browne 35'; McDaid 50' (pen.); Harkin 72'	Report	O'Carroll 53'; Caldwell 76'; Gormley 80'

=== Sixth round ===
The sixth round draw took place on 11 January 2014 after the fifth round matches were played, with the matches played on 8 February and 1 March 2014 and the replays played on 17 February and 1 March 2014. The 16 winners from the fifth round matches entered this round. Three clubs from tier three (Championship 2) made it into this round - the lowest ranked clubs that were left in the competition.

8 February 2014	Armagh City	1 – 1	Glentoran	Holm Park, Armagh
15:00 GMT	Donnelly 65'	Report	Kane 19'

8 February 2014	Ballyclare Comrades	2 – 1	Carrick Rangers	Dixon Park, Ballyclare
15:00 GMT	Agnew 6'; Smith 35'	Report	Gibson 45'

8 February 2014	Coleraine	2 – 3	Dungannon Swifts	The Showgrounds, Coleraine
15:00 GMT	McNeill 42'; Bradley 88'	Report	Hutchinson 39'; Harpur 52'; Topley 70'

8 February 2014	Crusaders	4 – 0	Ballymoney United	Seaview, Belfast
15:00 GMT	Owens 23', 37', 74'; Dempster 90'	Report

8 February 2014	Linfield	1 – 2	Ballymena United	Windsor Park, Belfast
15:00 GMT	Lowry 35'	Report	Jenkins 25'; Cushley 66'

8 February 2014	Lisburn Distillery	0 – 2	Queen's University	New Grosvenor Stadium, Ballyskeagh
15:00 GMT		Report	Fulton 19'; Allison 52'

8 February 2014	Warrenpoint Town	0 – 0	Bangor	Milltown, Warrenpoint
15:00 GMT		Report

1 March 2014	Ballinamallard United	0 – 3	Glenavon	Ferney Park, Ballinamallard
15:00 GMT		Report	Bates 10', 62', 90+1'

==== Replays ====
17 February 2014	Bangor	1 – 0	Warrenpoint Town	Clandeboye Park, Bangor
19:45 GMT	Walsh 61'	Report

1 March 2014	Glentoran	2 – 1	Armagh City	The Oval, Belfast
15:00 GMT	Magee 44' (pen.); Scullion 90'	Report	Murray 80'

=== Quarter-finals ===
The quarter-final draw took place on 8 February 2014 after the sixth round matches had been played, with the matches scheduled for 1 and 10 March 2014. Championship 2 club Queen's University were the lowest ranked team left in the competition - the only representatives from the third tier.

1 March 2014	Ballymena United	4 – 1	Dungannon Swifts	The Showgrounds, Ballymena
15:00 GMT	Munster 2'; Taylor 22'; Boyce 30', 87'	Report	Harpur 55'

1 March 2014	Crusaders	5 – 0	Ballyclare Comrades	Seaview, Belfast
15:00 GMT	Hanley 15' (pen.); Snoddy 55'; Caddell 76'; McAllister 87'; McCutcheon 90'	Report

1 March 2014	Queen's University	3 – 2	Bangor	Upper Malone, Belfast
15:00 GMT	Prenter 25', 58'; Ferrin 84' (pen.)	Report	Nixon 29'; Forsythe 90+5' (pen.)

10 March 2014	Glentoran	1 – 2	Glenavon	The Oval, Belfast
19:50 GMT	Magee 45' (pen.)	Report	Lindsay 88'; Bates 90'

=== Semi-finals ===
The semi-final draw took place on 1 March 2014 after the quarter-final matches had been played, with the matches played on 5 April 2014. Championship 2 club Queen's University reached the semi-finals for the first time in the club's history. They were the only semi-finalist from outside the top flight, and became the first club from outside the top two divisions to reach the semi-final stage since Killyleagh YC did so in 2001–02. For the first time since the 1996–97 competition, neither of the Big Two clubs – Glentoran or Linfield – reached the semi-final stage.

5 April 2014	Ballymena United	3 – 0	Queen's University	The Oval, Belfast
15:00 BST	Davidson 35', 50'; Kelly 89'	Report

5 April 2014	Glenavon	3 – 1 (a.e.t.)	Crusaders	Windsor Park, Belfast
15:00 BST	Martyn 66', 116'; Patton 114'	Report	Heatley 14'

=== Final ===
Both finalists were making their first Irish Cup final appearance of the 21st century, Ballymena United having last played in the showpiece when they lifted the cup in 1989. Glenavon reached the final for the first time since finishing as runners-up in 1998. It was the fourth meeting between the two clubs in the final, and the first since 1981, when Ballymena United won 1–0. The final was played on 3 May 2014 at Windsor Park, Belfast.

3 May 2014
14:30 BST

Ballymena United	1 – 2	Glenavon
Jenkins 71'	Report	Neill 35'; Patton 76'

Windsor Park, Belfast
Attendance: 7,282
Referee: Raymond Crangle
