= 2016–17 Irish Cup =

Tournament details
- Country: Northern Ireland
- Teams: 126

Final positions
- Champions: Linfield (43rd win)
- Runners-up: Coleraine

Tournament statistics
- Matches played: 120
- Goals scored: 516 (4.3 per match)

The 2016–17 Irish Cup (known as the Tennent's Irish Cup for sponsorship purposes) was the 137th edition of the Irish Cup, the premier knockout cup competition in Northern Irish football since its introduction in 1881. The competition began on 19 August 2016 and concluded with the final at Windsor Park on 6 May 2017.

Glenavon were the defending champions, after they lifted the cup for the seventh time by defeating Linfield 2–0 in the 2016 final. They were eliminated at the semi-final stage. The competition was won by Linfield, who defeated Coleraine 3-0 in the final.

== Format and schedule ==
126 clubs entered this season's competition, a decrease of three clubs compared with the 2015–16 total of 129 clubs. 12 members of the NIFL Premier Intermediate League and 90 regional league clubs from tiers 4–7 in the Northern Ireland football league system entered the competition in the first round, 26 of whom received a bye to proceed directly into the second round as necessitated by the number of participants. These clubs contested the first four rounds, with the eight surviving clubs joining the 24 senior NIFL Premiership and NIFL Championship clubs in the fifth round. Extra time was utilised to decide the victor in any games that remained tied after 90 minutes, with a penalty shootout following if required.

Round	Draw date	First match date	Fixtures	Clubs
First round		20 August 2016	38	126 → 88
Second round		1 October 2016	32	88 → 64
Third round		5 November 2016	16	64 → 48
Fourth round		3 December 2016	8	48 → 32
Fifth round		7 January 2017	16	32 → 16
Sixth round		4 February 2017	8	16 → 8
Quarter-finals		4 March 2017	4	8 → 4
Semi-finals		1 April 2017	2	4 → 2
Final		6 May 2017	1	2 → 1

Tiers	Leagues	No. of Entries	Entry round
1	NIFL Premiership	24	Fifth round
2	NIFL Championship	24	Fifth round
3	NIFL Premier Intermediate League	102	First round (Second round if byed)
4	Ballymena & Provincial Football League Premier Division; Mid-Ulster Football League Intermediate A Northern Amateur Football League Premier Division; Northern Ireland Intermediate League	102	First round (Second round if byed)
5	Mid-Ulster Football League Intermediate B Northern Amateur Football League Division 1A	102	First round (Second round if byed)
6	Northern Amateur Football League Division 1B	102	First round (Second round if byed)
7	Northern Amateur Football League Division 1C	102	First round (Second round if byed)

== Results ==
=== First round ===
Ties to be play on 20 August 2016. Twenty-six clubs received byes into the second round: Ardglass, Ards Rangers, Ballymoney United, Ballynahinch United, Barn United, Camlough Rovers, Crumlin Star, Donard Hospital, Dromara Village, Drumaness Mills, Dundela, Killyleagh Youth, Larne Tech. Old Boys, Lisburn Rangers, Maiden City, Mossley, Nortel, Portstewart, Richhill A.F.C., St Luke's, St Mary's Youth, Seagoe, Short Brothers, Strabane Athletic, Tobermore United and Wakehurst. Maiden City later withdrew.

Team 1	Score	Team 2
19 August 2016
Newington (3)	3–2	Bangor (3)
Windmill Stars (4)	5–0	Tullyvallen (5)
20 August 2016
18th Newtownabbey Old Boys (7)	5–3	Bangor Amateurs (7)
Abbey Villa (5)	5–0	Holywood (7)
Ballynure Old Boys (4)	4–1	Albert Foundry (4)
Ballywalter Recreation (6)	1–2	Ardstraw (4)
Banbridge Rangers (4)	4–4 (aet) (3–4 p)	Derriaghy Cricket Club (4)
Bloomfield (7)	3–4	Seapatrick (4)
Brantwood (4)	3–3 (aet) (1–3 p)	Comber Recreation (5)
Chimney Corner (4)	0–5	Crewe United (4)
Coagh United (4)	2–1	Malachians (4)
Craigavon City (5)	1–6	Grove United (6)
Desertmartin (4)	2–0	Newcastle (5)
Dollingstown (4)	4–2	Newbuildings United (4)
Donegal Celtic (3)	1–3	Oxford United Stars (4)
Downshire Young Men (6)	4–0	Rathfern Rangers (6)
Dungiven Celtic (4)	1–0	Saintfield United (7)
Dunloy (4)	3–0	Wellington Recreation (6)
East Belfast (5)	5–2	Dundonald (5)
Fivemiletown United (4)	w/o	Killymoon Rangers (4)
Glebe Rangers (4)	4–0	Iveagh United (7)
Islandmagee (5)	4–1	Ballymacash Rangers (4)
Lisburn Distillery (3)	4–0	Rosario YC (6)
Limavady United (3)	2–0	Banbridge Town (3)
Lurgan Town (5)	2–1	Laurelvale (5)
Moneyslane (4)	6–1	Magherafelt Sky Blues (4)
Newry City (3)	7–0	Oxford Sunnyside (5)
Portaferry Rovers (6)	2–3	Silverwood (5)
Queen's University (3)	14–0	Dromore Amateurs (7)
Rathfriland Rangers (4)	3–3 (aet) (4–2 p)	Moyola Park (3)
St Patrick's Young Men (5)	5–4	Markethill Swifts (5)
Shankill United (4)	0–4	Crumlin United (4)
Sirocco Works (6)	2–2 (aet) (4–1 p)	Hanover (4)
Sport & Leisure Swifts (3)	3–2	Ballynahinch Olympic (5)
Trojans (4)	3–1	Immaculata (4)
UUJ (6)	4–0	Dungannon Rovers (5)
Valley Rangers (4)	3–1	Newtowne (4)
21 August 2016
Sofia Farmer (4)	2–1	Lower Maze (5)

=== Second round ===
Due to there being an uneven number of clubs left on account of Maiden City's withdrawal, in the draw Dollingstown received a bye to the third round. Matches played on 1 October 2016.

Team 1	Score	Team 2
18th Newtownabbey Old Boys (7)	2–1	Ballynahinch United (6)
Abbey Villa (5)	4–1	Dungiven Celtic (4)
Ards Rangers (4)	2–0	Lurgan Town (5)
Barn United (6)	2–1	Dundela (3)
Camlough Rovers (4)	0–5	Dromara Village (6)
Coagh United (4)	0–0 (aet) (2–3 p)	Derriaghy Cricket Club (4)
Comber Recreation (5)	5–2	Ardstraw (4)
Crewe United (4)	5–1	Ardglass (4)
Crumlin Star (4)	1–2	Trojans (4)
Crumlin United (4)	2–3	Ballymoney United (4)
Downshire Young Men (6)	2–2 (aet) (3–2 p)	UUJ (6)
Fivemiletown United (4)	4–1	Sirocco Works (6)
Glebe Rangers (4)	3–2	Silverwood (5)
Grove United (6)	4–4 (aet) (3–1 p)	Rathfriland Rangers (4)
Islandmagee (5)	5–3	Killyleagh YC (5)
Larne Tech Old Boys (5)	1–2	Wakehurst (4)
Lisburn Rangers (4)	4–2	Ballynure Old Boys (4)
Moneyslane (4)	0–2	Portstewart (4)
Mossley (6)	1–4	St Luke's (7)
Newry City (3)	1–3	Newington (3)
Queen's University (3)	0–1	Lisburn Distillery (3)
Richhill (5)	w/o	Nortel (4)
Seapatrick (4)	0–2	Drumaness Mills (4)
Shorts (7)	8–0	Dunloy (4)
Sofia Farmer (4)	2–0	Limavady United (3)
Sport & Leisure Swifts (3)	2–1	St Patrick's Young Men (5)
St Mary's YC (4)	4–5	Oxford United Stars (4)
Strabane Athletic (4)	4–5	East Belfast (5)
Tobermore United (3)	6–0	Desertmartin (4)
Valley Rangers (4)	7–0	Seagoe (5)
Windmill Stars (4)	w/o	Donard Hospital (7)

=== Third round ===
Ties played on 5 November 2016.

Team 1	Score	Team 2
Abbey Villa (5)	2–3	Dollingstown (4)
Comber Rec (5)	2–3	St Luke's (7)
Crewe United (4)	3–1	Ballymoney United (4)
Derriaghy Cricket Club (4)	2–0	Valley Rangers (4)
Dromara Village (6)	1–2	Drumaness Mills (4)
Dundela (3)	3–2	Downshire Young Men (6)
East Belfast (5)	0–2	Shorts (7)
Fivemiletown United (4)	5–4	Newington (3)
Glebe Rangers (4)	0–0 (aet) (3–4 p)	Grove United (6)
Killyleagh YC (5)	0–5	Portstewart (4)
Lisburn Rangers (4)	0–1	Lisburn Distillery (3)
Richhill (5)	1–0	Oxford United Stars (4)
Sofia Farmer (4)	0–2	Windmill Stars (4)
Sport & Leisure Swifts (3)	3–2	Ards Rangers (4)
Tobermore United (3)	2–1	Wakehurst (4)
Trojans (4)	w/o	18th Newtownabbey Old Boys (7)

=== Fourth round ===
Ties played on 3 December 2016.

Team 1	Score	Team 2
Derriaghy Cricket Club (4)	2–4	Portstewart (4)
Dundela (3)	3–4	Fivemiletown United (4)
Lisburn Distillery (3)	3–0	St Luke's (7)
Richhill (5)	6–2	Grove United (6)
Sport & Leisure Swifts (3)	1–3	Dollingstown (4)
Tobermore United (3)	6–0	Shorts (7)
Trojans (4)	3–1	Drumaness Mills (4)
Windmill Stars (4)	3–4	Crewe United (4)

=== Fifth round ===
Ties played on 7 January 2017. The draw resulted in a clash between Belfast's Big Two.

Team 1	Score	Team 2
Annagh United (2)	0–2	Tobermore United (3)
Armagh City (2)	2–1	Trojans (4)
Ballyclare Comrades (2)	2–4	Institute (2)
Ballymena United (1)	1–1(aet) (4–3 p)	Cliftonville (1)
Coleraine (1)	5–1	Carrick Rangers (1)
Crusaders (1)	2–0	Ards (1)
Dungannon Swifts (1)	3–0	Dergview (2)
Glenavon (1)	4–1	Portstewart (4)
Glentoran (1)	1–2(aet)	Linfield (1)
Harland & Wolff Welders (2)	1–0	Lurgan Celtic (2)
Knockbreda (2)	1–2	Crewe United (4)
Larne (2)	1–2	Portadown (1)
Loughgall (2)	3–0	Fivemiletown United (4)
PSNI (2)	2–1	Lisburn Distillery (3)
Richhill (5)	1–4	Dollingstown (4)
Warrenpoint Town (2)	0–0(aet) (5–4 p)	Ballinamallard United (1)

=== Sixth round ===
Ties to be played on 4 February 2017.

Team 1	Score	Team 2
Armagh City (2)	0–2	Glenavon (1)
Coleraine (1)	1–0	Tobermore United (3)
Crusaders (1)	2–0	PSNI (2)
Dungannon Swifts (1)	4–1	Dollingstown (4)
Harland & Wolff Welders (2)	1–3	Ballymena United (1)
Institute (2)	0–2	Linfield (1)
Loughgall (2)	1–2	Portadown (1)
Warrenpoint Town (2)	5–0	Crewe United (4)

=== Quarter-finals ===
The 8 winners of the sixth round matches entered the quarter-finals. The draw took place on 5 February 2017, with the matches to be played on 4 March 2017. As the only representative from the NIFL Championship, Warrenpoint Town was the lowest-ranked club to reach the quarter-finals.

Team 1	Score	Team 2
Ballymena United (1)	0–4	Coleraine (1)
Crusaders (1)	0–2	Linfield (1)
Dungannon Swifts (1)	2–1 (aet)	Warrenpoint Town (2)
Portadown (1)	0–5	Glenavon (1)

=== Semi-finals ===
The 4 winners of the quarter-finals entered the semi-finals with the ties played on 1 April 2017 with Linfield and Coleraine advancing to contest the 2017 final.

Team 1	Score	Team 2
Linfield (1)	1–0	Dungannon Swifts (1)
Coleraine (1)	2–1	Glenavon (1)

=== Final ===
Linfield and Coleraine contested the final with Linfield winning 3–0 to secure the Cup for a record 43rd time, and claim their first league and cup double since 2012. Andrew Waterworth became the first player in 48 years to score a hat trick in an Irish Cup final. Billy McAvoy had been the last player to achieve the feat, having done so for Ards in their 4–2 win over Distillery in the 1969 final replay.

6 May 2017
14:30 BST (GMT+1)

Linfield	3–0	Coleraine
Waterworth 29', 33', 87'	Report

Windsor Park, Belfast
Attendance: 12,551
Referee: Keith Kennedy
