= 2012–13 Irish Cup =

Tournament details
- Country: Northern Ireland
- Teams: 119

Final positions
- Champions: Glentoran (21st win)
- Runners-up: Cliftonville

Tournament statistics
- Matches played: 121
- Goals scored: 480 (3.97 per match)

The 2012–13 Irish Cup was the 133rd edition of the Irish Cup, Northern Ireland's premier football knockout cup competition. The competition began on 15 September 2012 with the first round and ended on 4 May 2013 with the final. The cup was sponsored by JJB Sports until October 2012, when the company went into administration. The competition remained without a principal sponsor, but the final was known as the Marie Curie Irish Cup final, after the IFA awarded the naming rights for the final to the charity Marie Curie Cancer Care.

Linfield were the defending champions, after defeating Crusaders 4–1 in the 2012 final to win the cup for the sixth time in seven seasons. However, in a tie that was a repeat of the previous two finals, they were knocked out in the fifth round by Crusaders, who inflicted Linfield's first defeat in the competition in four years.

The eventual winners were Glentoran, coming from a goal behind to defeat Cliftonville 3–1 after extra time to win their first Irish Cup in nine years. Glentoran qualified for the 2013–14 UEFA Europa League first qualifying round.

== Format and schedule ==
119 clubs took part in this season's competition, an increase on the 116 clubs that took part the previous season. Clubs from level 4 and below on the Northern Ireland football league system entered in the first round, and played against other lower league clubs in the first three rounds. Depending on the number of participants, some clubs may be given a bye into the second round. Nine clubs were given a bye this season.

28 of the 30 IFA Championship clubs that started the season entered in the fourth round. Newry City folded after the start of the season and, of the remaining 29 clubs, PSNI did not enter on time. The IFA Championship clubs were joined in the fourth round by the lower league clubs that progressed through the first three rounds.

The winners from the fourth round matches joined the clubs from the IFA Premiership in the fifth round, and from then on it was a straight knock-out competition through to the final. Replays were only used in the fifth round, sixth round and quarter final stages, otherwise extra time and penalties were used to determine the winner if necessary.

Round	Draw date	First match date	Fixtures		Clubs
Round	Draw date	First match date	Original	Replays	Clubs
First round	16 August 2012	15 September 2012	35		119 → 84
Second round	25 September 2012	20 October 2012	22		84 → 62
Third round	1 November 2012	17 November 2012	10		62 → 52
Fourth round	22 November 2012	8 December 2012	20		52 → 32
Fifth round	13 December 2012	12 January 2013	16	3	32 → 16
Sixth round	12 January 2013	9 February 2013	8	0	16 → 8
Quarter-finals	9 February 2013	2 March 2013	4	1	8 → 4
Semi-finals	2 March 2013	6 April 2013	2		4 → 2
Final		4 May 2013	1		2 → 1

== Results ==
=== First round ===
The draw for the first round was held on 16 August 2012 with the matches played on 15 September 2012.

Ballynahinch United, Bangor Amateurs, Crumlin United, Dunmurry Rec., Killyleagh Youth, Magherafelt Sky Blues, Mountjoy United, Newbuildings United and Saintfield United all received byes into the second round.

Team 1	Score	Team 2
15 September 2012
18th Newtownabbey Old Boys	0–2	Camlough Rovers
Abbey Villa	5–1	Shorts
Ballywalter Recreation	0–5	Bangor Swifts
Bangor Rangers	0–1 (aet)	UUJ
Bloomfield	2–1	Laurelvale
Bryansburn Rangers	0–1	Crumlin Star
Carniny Amateurs	3–3 (4–2 p)	Ardstraw
Desertmartin	0–4	Rathfriland Rangers
Dollingstown	3–2	Dunmurry Young Men
Downshire Young Men	3–1	Crewe United
Draperstown Celtic	2–6 (aet)	Drumaness Mills
Dungiven Celtic	0–2	Dromore Amateurs
East Belfast	1–5	Comber Recreation
Fivemiletown United	0–1 (aet)	Shankill United
Groomsport	0–3	Ards Rangers
Holywood	0–2	Ballynure Old Boys
Kilmore Recreation	5–0	Lurgan Town
Kilroot Rec.	1–2	Seagoe
Larne Tech Old Boys	1–2	Islandmagee
Lisanally Rangers	0–3	Dromara Village
Lisburn Rangers	2–1	Grove United
Lower Maze	5–2	Iveagh United
Malachians	2–2 (4–2 p)	Newington Youth Club
Markethill Swifts	1–6	Immaculata
Newcastle	1–1 (4–3 p)	Ballymacash Rangers
Newtowne	5–1	Moneyslane
Nortel	3–1	Mossley
Oxford Sunnyside	3–3 (3–0 p)	1st Bangor Old Boys
Oxford United Stars	3–2	Brantwood
Rathfern Rangers	2–2 (5–4 p)	Banbridge Rangers
Richhill	1–3	Barn United
Roe Rovers	1–3	Rosario Youth Club
Sirocco Works	2–1	Raceview
Tandragee Rovers	1–0	Derriaghy Cricket Club
Wellington Recreation	8–0	FC Ballynure^{1}

Source: irishfa.com

^{1}Wellington Recreation were disqualified for fielding an ineligible player, their opponents were reinstated.

=== Second round ===
The draw for the second round took place on 25 September 2012. The 35 winners from the first round matches entered the competition at this round, along with the 9 clubs that received a bye. The matches were played on 20 and 27 October 2012.

Team 1	Score	Team 2
20 October 2012
Ards Rangers	6–0	Lower Maze
Ballynahinch United	2–1	Dromore Amateurs
Ballynure Old Boys	3–2	Carniny Amateurs
Bloomfield	1–3	Rathfriland Rangers
Comber Recreation	4–1	Camlough Rovers^{2}
Dollingstown	1–2	Oxford United Stars
Downshire Young Men	1–3	Sirocco Works
Dromara Village	0–2	Killyleagh Youth^{2}
Drumaness Mills	4–2	Saintfield United
Dunmurry Rec.	4–2	Bangor Swifts
Immaculata	4–1	Newbuildings United
Islandmagee	7–0	Shankill United
Nortel	0–3	Kilmore Recreation
Oxford Sunnyside	2–3	Crumlin United
Rathfern Rangers	2–1	Abbey Villa
Rosario Youth Club	2–0	Magherafelt Sky Blues
Seagoe	3–4	Malachians
Tandragee Rovers	3–1	Newtowne
UUJ	1–2	Lisburn Rangers
27 October 2012
Bangor Amateurs	2–3	Newcastle
Barn United	1–2	Crumlin Star
FC Ballynure	1–3	Mountjoy United

Source: irishfa.com

^{2}Comber Recreation and Killyleagh Youth were both disqualified for fielding an ineligible player, their opponents were reinstated.

=== Third round ===
The draw for the third round took place on 1 November 2012. The 22 winners from the second round matches entered the draw for this round, with 20 of the clubs drawn to play against each other. Oxford United Stars and Rathfriland Rangers both received a bye into the fourth round because of the demise of Championship club Newry City, and the failure of fellow Championship club PSNI to enter on time. This had reduced the number of teams in the fourth round and hence it was decided to draw two byes in the third round to make up the requisite fourth-round numbers. The matches were played on 17 November 2012.

Team 1	Score	Team 2
17 November 2012
Ballynure Old Boys	2–1	Rathfern Rangers
Camlough Rovers	2–3	Ards Rangers
Crumlin United	1–2	Dromara Village
Drumaness Mills	3–2	Islandmagee
Immaculata	8–1	Dunmurry Rec.
Kilmore Recreation	4–3	Malachians
Lisburn Rangers	1–3	Ballynahinch United
Newcastle	0–3	Crumlin Star
Sirocco Works	0–1	Mountjoy United
Tandragee Rovers	0–2	Rosario Youth Club

Source: irishfa.com

=== Fourth round ===
The draw for the fourth round was made on 22 November 2012. 28 of the 29 clubs from the IFA Championship entered the competition at this stage (PSNI not having entered). They were joined by the 10 winners of the third round matches and the two clubs that received byes. The matches were played on 8 December 2012.

Team 1	Score	Team 2
8 December 2012
Annagh United	3–3 (6–7p)	Rosario Youth Club
Ards Rangers	3–5	Immaculata
Armagh City	2–2 (4–5p)	Ards
Ballyclare Comrades	3–2	Portstewart
Ballymoney United	1–1 (3–4p)	Ballynahinch United
Bangor	3–0	Crumlin Star
Chimney Corner	0–2	Loughgall
Dundela	1–0	Glebe Rangers
Harland & Wolff Welders	2–0	Oxford United Stars
Institute	1–0	Dergview
Killymoon Rangers	4–2	Dromara Village
Kilmore Recreation	w/o	Drumaness Mills^{3}
Larne	3–2	Wakehurst
Limavady United	0–3	Knockbreda
Lurgan Celtic	1–0	Carrick Rangers
Moyola Park	0–2	Coagh United
Queen's University	3–1	Banbridge Town
Rathfriland Rangers	1–0	Ballynure Old Boys
Tobermore United	7–1	Mountjoy United
Warrenpoint Town	4–2	Sport & Leisure Swifts

Source: irishfa.com

^{3}Drumaness Mills were disqualified for fielding an ineligible player, their opponents received a walkover.

=== Fifth round ===
The fifth round draw was made on 13 December 2012. The 12 clubs from the IFA Premiership entered the competition at this stage, along with the 20 winners from the fourth round matches. The matches were played on 12 January 2013, with the replays being played on 22 January and 4 February 2013.

Team 1	Score	Team 2
12 January 2013
Ards	4–0	Immaculata
Ballyclare Comrades	2–3	Bangor
Ballymena United	2–1	Warrenpoint Town
Cliftonville	4–2	Ballinamallard United
Coleraine	7–0	Ballynahinch United
Dundela	4–3	Queen's University
Glenavon	5–1	Harland & Wolff Welders
Institute	2–1	Rathfriland Rangers
Killymoon Rangers	1–4	Glentoran
Knockbreda	5–1	Rosario Youth Club
Larne	1–1	Lurgan Celtic
Linfield	2–2	Crusaders
Lisburn Distillery	5–1	Coagh United
Loughgall	1–3	Donegal Celtic
Portadown	2–1	Dungannon Swifts
Tobermore United	2–2	Kilmore Recreation

==== Replays ====
Team 1	Score	Team 2
22 January 2013
Crusaders	2–1	Linfield
Tobermore United	0–1	Kilmore Recreation
4 February 2013
Larne	1–4	Lurgan Celtic

Source: irishfa.com

=== Sixth round ===
The sixth round draw was made after the fifth round matches were played on 12 January. The matches were played on 9 and 26 February 2013. Northern Amateur Football League club Kilmore Recreation were the lowest ranked side in the draw as the only club from outside the IFA Premiership or IFA Championship left in the competition.

Team 1	Score	Team 2
9 February 2013
Ballymena United	2–3	Coleraine
Bangor	2–5	Glentoran
Cliftonville	2–0	Donegal Celtic
Crusaders	4–1	Glenavon
Institute	0–2	Kilmore Recreation
Lurgan Celtic	0–3	Knockbreda
Portadown	1–0	Ards
26 February 2013
Lisburn Distillery	2–1	Dundela

Source: irishfa.com

=== Quarter-finals ===
The quarter-final draw was made after the sixth round matches were played on 9 February. The matches were played on 2 March 2013, with one replay taking place on 12 March. Northern Amateur Football League club Kilmore Recreation were the lowest ranked side in the draw as the only club from outside the IFA Premiership or IFA Championship left in the competition.

2 March 2013
15:00 GMT

Cliftonville	2 – 0	Kilmore Recreation
Seydak 56'; Donnelly 86'	Report

Solitude, Belfast

2 March 2013
15:00 GMT

Coleraine	0 – 3	Portadown
	Report	Braniff 34', 87' (pen.); Murray 68' (pen.)

The Showgrounds, Coleraine

2 March 2013
15:00 GMT

Crusaders	1 – 1	Lisburn Distillery
Adamson 18'	Report	Boyd 12'

Seaview, Belfast

2 March 2013
15:00 GMT

Knockbreda	1 – 3	Glentoran
McClean 18'	Report	Magee 12' (pen.); McMenamin 53' (o.g.); Waterworth 68'

Breda Park, Belfast

==== Replay ====
12 March 2013
19:30 GMT

Lisburn Distillery	1 – 1 (a.e.t.)	Crusaders
Withers 75'	Report	Owens 52'
Penalties
	3 – 4

New Grosvenor Stadium, Ballyskeagh

=== Semi-finals ===
The semi-final draw was made after the quarter-final matches were played on 2 March. The matches were played on 6 April 2013.

6 April 2013
12:30 BST

Portadown	0 – 1	Glentoran
	Report	Kane 79'

Windsor Park, Belfast

6 April 2013
16:30 BST

Crusaders	0 – 2	Cliftonville
	Report	McMullan 67' (pen.); Gormley 68'

The Oval, Belfast

=== Final ===
The final took place on 4 May 2013 at Windsor Park.

4 May 2013
14:30 BST

Cliftonville	1 – 3 (a.e.t.)	Glentoran
Gormley 34'	Report	Waterworth 64', 101'; Callacher 99'

Windsor Park, Belfast
Attendance: 9,825
Referee: Arnold Hunter
