= 2010–11 Irish Cup =

Tournament details
- Country: Northern Ireland
- Teams: 114

Final positions
- Champions: Linfield (41st win)
- Runners-up: Crusaders

Tournament statistics
- Matches played: 123
- Goals scored: 539 (4.38 per match)

The 2010–11 Irish Cup (known as the JJB Sports Irish Cup for sponsorship reasons) was the 131st edition of the Irish Cup, Northern Ireland's premier football knock-out cup competition. The competition began on 18 September 2010 with the First Round and ended on 7 May 2011 with the Final.

Linfield were the champions, winning their fifth Irish Cup in the last six seasons, by defeating Crusaders 2–1 in the final, who were appearing in their second final in the last three seasons. Crusaders qualified for the second qualifying round of the 2011–12 UEFA Europa League because Linfield had already qualified for the Champions League via the league.

== Results ==
=== First round ===
The draw for the first round was held on 28 August 2010. Matches were scheduled to be played on 18 September 2010.

Team 1	Score	Team 2
18th Newtownabbey Old Boys	2–5	Broomhedge
Abbey Villa	2–0	Ballynahinch United
A.F.C. Craigavon	1–2	Shankill United
Ardglass	3–1	Sirocco Works
Ards Rangers	9–2	FC Ballynure
Ardstraw	6–1	Seagoe
Barn United	3–2	Saintfield United
Bloomfield	5–2	Hanover
Bryansburn Rangers	5–2	NFC Kesh
Camlough Rovers	5–2	Lurgan Town Boys
Desertmartin	0–2	Brantwood
Downpatrick	2–1	Drumaness Mills
Downshire Young Men	2–1	Holywood
Draperstown Celtic	1–2 (a.e.t)	Crewe United
Dromara Village	7–3	Lisanally Rangers
East Belfast	1–2	Newington Rangers
Fivemiletown United	2–6	Nortel
Islandmagee	4–1	Rathfern Rangers
Kilbride Swifts	4–3	Groomsport
Killyleagh Youth	3–1	Banbridge Rangers
Kilmore Recreation	6–3	1st Bangor Old Boys
Lisburn Rangers	6–1	Donard Hospital
Lower Maze	1–4	Grove United
Malachians	5–1	Bangor Rangers
Mossley Young Men	0–1	Crumlin United
Mountjoy United	1–2	Magherafelt Sky Blues
Newcastle	1–5	Dollingstown
Raceview	2–4	Comber Recreation
Rathfriland Rangers	1–2	Tandragee Rovers
Rosario Youth Club	3–2	Laurelvale
Shorts	2–4	Ballynure Old Boys
U.U.C.	w/o	Albert Foundry
Wellington Recreation	5–0	Strabane

=== Second round ===
The draw for the second round was held on 24 September 2010. Games were played on Saturday 23 October 2010.

Team 1	Score	Team 2
Albert Foundry	3–1	Larne Tech Old Boys
Ardglass	4–1	Bangor Swifts
Ardstraw	2–1	Crewe United
Ballynure Old Boys	0–0 (4–5 p)	Broomhedge
Brantwood	0–1	Dunmurry Recreation
Camlough Rovers	2–0	Barn United
Crumlin United	4–1	Bloomfield
Derriaghy Cricket Club	2–3	Newington Youth Club
Dollingstown	5–3	Lisburn Rangers
Downpatrick	0–4	Nortel
Dromara Village	3–1	Downshire Young Men
Dungiven Celtic	3–2	Newington Rangers
Grove United	1–3	Comber Recreation
Islandmagee	3–2	Abbey Villa
Kilbride Swifts	2–3	Tandragee Rovers
Kilmore Recreation	4–2	Killyleagh Youth
Magherafelt Sky Blues	2–0	Bryansburn Rangers
Malachians	4–2	Ards Rangers
Richhill	0–3	Shankill United
Rosario Youth Club	3–2	Wellington Recreation

=== Third round ===
Matches were played on 20 November 2010 and 27 November 2010.

Team 1	Score	Team 2
Ardglass	1–2	Kilmore Recreation
Ardstraw	3–6	Albert Foundry
Broomhedge	0–5	Dunmurry Recreation
Dollingstown	2–4	Comber Recreation
Islandmagee	1–3	Dungiven Celtic
Magherafelt Sky Blues	0–1	Shankill United
Malachians	1–2	Crumlin United
Newington Youth Club	8–0	Tandragee Rovers
Nortel	2–0	Camlough Rovers
Rosario Youth Club	3–1	Dromara Village

=== Fourth round ===
The fourth round draw took place on 25 November 2010. All 30 clubs from IFA Championship 1 and 2 entered the competition at this stage. As well as the 10 intermediate clubs that had progressed through the previous rounds. Matches were played on 11 December 2010 and two re-arranged ties were played on 15 January 2011.

Team 1	Score	Team 2
Albert Foundry	3–1	Rosario Youth Club
Annagh United	2–1	Killymoon Rangers
Armagh City	2–3	Crumlin United
Ballyclare Comrades	2–4	Harland & Wolff Welders
Banbridge Town	0–1	Shankill United
Coagh United	2–5	Ards
Dergview	2–3	Ballinamallard United
Dundela	5–0	Chimney Corner
Glebe Rangers	1–2	Nortel
Institute	0–0 (5–4 p)	Newington Youth Club
Knockbreda	0–2	Ballymoney United
Larne	2–1	Bangor
Limavady United	2–0	Wakehurst
Lurgan Celtic	2–2 (4–5 p)	Dunmurry Recreation
Moyola Park	1–6	Carrick Rangers
Portstewart	0–2	Kilmore Recreation
Queen's University	3–2	PSNI
Sport & Leisure Swifts	5–3	Dungiven Celtic
Tobermore United	3–5	Loughgall
Warrenpoint Town	3–2	Comber Recreation

=== Fifth round ===
The fifth round draw took place on 15 December 2010. All 12 clubs from the IFA Premiership entered the competition at this stage, as well as the 20 winners of the previous round of matches. Matches were played on 15 January 2011. Replays were played on 25 January 2011.

Team 1	Score	Team 2
Albert Foundry	0–2	Nortel
Annagh United	2–6	Glenavon
Ards	2–2	Harland & Wolff Welders
Ballinamallard United	3–1	Larne
Ballymena United	1–1	Glentoran
Carrick Rangers	3–3	Shankill United
Crusaders	3–2	Newry City
Dundela	1–4	Lisburn Distillery
Dungannon Swifts	5–1	Ballymoney United
Dunmurry Recreation	2–2	Kilmore Recreation
Limavady United	1–2	Coleraine
Linfield	5–1	Institute
Loughgall	3–1	Sport & Leisure Swifts
Portadown	4–3	Donegal Celtic
Queen's University	1–0	Crumlin United
Warrenpoint Town	1–1	Cliftonville
Replays
Ards	0–1 (a.e.t)	Harland & Wolff Welders
Carrick Rangers	6–1	Shankill United
Cliftonville	0–0 (1–3 p)	Warrenpoint Town
Glentoran	3–2 (a.e.t)	Ballymena United
Kilmore Recreation	0–5	Dunmurry Recreation

=== Sixth round ===
The sixth round draw took place on 15 January 2011. Matches were played on 12 February 2011. During the draw ball 16 was mistakenly named as number 10, leaving confusion when 10 was read out a second time.

Team 1	Score	Team 2
Carrick Rangers	1–3	Coleraine
Crusaders	2–1	Nortel
Dungannon Swifts	4–2	Warrenpoint Town
Glenavon	2–0	Queen's University
Glentoran	3–1	Loughgall
Harland & Wolff Welders	1–1	Portadown
Linfield	1–1	Dunmurry Recreation
Lisburn Distillery	2–2	Ballinamallard United
Replays
Ballinamallard United	4–2	Lisburn Distillery
Linfield	3–0	Dunmurry Recreation
Portadown	1–0	Harland & Wolff Welders

=== Quarter-finals ===
The Quarter-finals were played on 5 March 2011. The replays were played on 14 March 2011.

Team 1	Score	Team 2
Ballinamallard United	0–5	Crusaders
Dungannon Swifts	0–2	Linfield
Glentoran	1–1	Coleraine
Portadown	3–3	Glenavon
Replays
Coleraine	3–3 (2–3 p)	Glentoran
Glenavon	0–3	Portadown

=== Semi-finals ===
The Semi-finals were played on 9 April 2011.

9 April 2011
14:30 BST

Crusaders	3–1	Portadown
Halliday 38'; Caddell 68'; Owens 85'	Report	Clarke 4'

Mourneview Park, Lurgan

9 April 2011
14:30 BST

Linfield	2–0	Glentoran
Tomelty 32'; Thompson 60'	Report

Windsor Park, Belfast

=== Final ===
7 May 2011
14:30 BST

Crusaders	1–2	Linfield
Caddell 54'	Report	Thompson 78'; McAllister 87'

Windsor Park, Belfast
Attendance: 8,200
Referee: Mark Courtney
