= 2019–20 Irish Cup =

2019–20 Irish football Cup

Tournament details
- Country: Northern Ireland
- Dates: 17 Aug 2019 – 31 Jul 2020
- Teams: 125

Final positions
- Champions: Glentoran (23rd win)
- Runners-up: Ballymena United

Tournament statistics
- Matches played: 122
- Goals scored: 539 (4.42 per match)

The 2019–20 Irish Cup (known as the Sadler’s Peaky Blinder Irish Cup for sponsorship purposes) was the 140th edition of the Irish Cup, the premier knockout cup competition in Northern Irish football since its inauguration in 1881. The competition began on 17 August 2019, and concluded with the final at Windsor Park on 31 July 2020. The final was the first football match in the United Kingdom to host fans since the COVID-19 pandemic in the United Kingdom led to a pause in the season in March, with 250 fans from each team permitted at the final.

Crusaders were the defending champions, having defeated NIFL Championship side Ballinamallard United 3–0 in the 2019 final to lift the cup for the fourth time overall; their first since winning the 2009 final ten years earlier.

Glentoran were the champions, taking their tally to 23 Irish Cup wins overall; their first for five years. They defeated Ballymena United 2–1 after extra time in the delayed final to qualify for the 2020–21 UEFA Europa League preliminary round.

== Format and schedule ==
All ties level after 90 minutes used extra time to determine the winner, with a penalty shoot-out to follow if necessary.

125 clubs entered this season's competition – one fewer compared with the 2018–19 total of 126 clubs. Along with 35 of the 36 Northern Ireland Football League clubs (Lurgan Celtic withdrew from the league after the start of the season), 90 regional league clubs from tiers 4–7 in the Northern Ireland football league system also entered the competition. All 101 clubs from level 3 and below entered in the first round, with 74 of them drawn into 37 first round fixtures and the remaining 27 clubs receiving a bye. The 37 first round winners were then joined by the 27 byes in the second round. After two further rounds, the eight surviving clubs join the 24 senior NIFL Premiership and NIFL Championship clubs in the fifth round.

Round	First match date	Fixtures	Clubs
First round	17 August 2019	37	125 → 88
Second round	27 September 2019	30	88 → 56
Third round	2 November 2019	16	56 → 40
Fourth round	30 November 2019	8	40 → 32
Fifth round	4 January 2020	16	32 → 16
Sixth round	February 2020	8	16 → 8
Quarter-finals	March 2020	4	8 → 4
Semi-finals	March 2020	2	4 → 2
Final	2 May 2020	1	2 → 1

Tiers	Leagues	No. of Entries	Entry round
1	NIFL Premiership	12	Fifth round
2	NIFL Championship	12	Fifth round
3	NIFL Premier Intermediate League	11	First round (Second round if byed)
4	Ballymena & Provincial Football League Premier Division; Mid-Ulster Football League Intermediate A Northern Amateur Football League Premier Division; Northern Ireland Intermediate League	90	First round (Second round if byed)
5	Mid-Ulster Football League Intermediate B Northern Amateur Football League Division 1A	90	First round (Second round if byed)
6	Northern Amateur Football League Division 1B	90	First round (Second round if byed)
7	Northern Amateur Football League Division 1C	90	First round (Second round if byed)

== Results ==
The league tier of each club at the time of entering the competition is listed in parentheses.

- (1) = NIFL Premiership
- (2) = NIFL Championship
- (3) = NIFL Premier Intermediate League
- (NL) = Non-league (clubs outside the Northern Ireland Football League – levels 4–7)

=== First round ===
The draw for the first round took place on 5 July 2019. All clubs from level 3 and below entered in the first round, with 74 of them drawn into 37 first round fixtures and the remaining 27 clubs receiving a bye into the second round. The ties were played on 17 August 2019.

Team 1	Score	Team 2
Albert Foundry (NL)	3–1	Bloomfield (NL)
Annagh United (3)	4–1	Derriaghy Cricket Club (NL)
Armagh City (3)	7–0	1st Bangor Old Boys (NL)
Ballynahinch Olympic (NL)	2–3	Bangor (3)
Banbridge Town (3)	2–1	Dungiven (NL)
Barn United (NL)	0–3	Oxford Sunnyside (NL)
Belfast Celtic (NL)	9–1	Dromore Amateurs (NL)
Bryansburn Rangers (NL)	1–3	Crumlin United (NL)
Chimney Corner (NL)	5–1	Laurelvale (NL)
Comber Recreation (NL)	2–0	Bangor Amateurs (NL)
Cookstown Royal British Legion (NL)	2–3	Glebe Rangers (NL)
Cookstown Youth (NL)	0–5	Newington (3)
Craigavon City (NL)	5–0	Seapatrick (NL)
Crumlin Star (NL)	8–0	Kilmore Recreation (NL)
Downshire Young Men (NL)	2–0	Rectory Rangers (NL)
Dromara Village (NL)	3–6	Coagh United (NL)
East Belfast (NL)	3–1	St Mary's (NL)
Fivemiletown United (NL)	2–3	Ardstraw (NL)
Grove United (NL)	2–4	Newcastle (NL)
Holywood (NL)	1–4	Newbuildings United (NL)

Team 1	Score	Team 2
Iveagh United (NL)	1–3	Lurgan Town (NL)
Limavady United (3)	3–0	Ballynure Old Boys (NL)
Maiden City (NL)	3–2	Bourneview Mill (NL)
Malachians (NL)	1–2	Moneyslane (NL)
Mossley (NL)	4–1	Markethill Swifts (NL)
Moyola Park (3)	11–0	Colin Valley (NL)
Rosario Youth (NL)	0–1	Killyleagh Youth (NL)
Rosemount Recreation (NL)	2–3	Dunmurry Rec. (NL)
Saintfield United (NL)	0–2	Banbridge Rangers (NL)
Sirocco Works (NL)	2–2 (3–4 p)	Seagoe (NL)
St James' Swifts (NL)	4–1	Abbey Villa (NL)
St Oliver Plunkett (NL)	2–2 (2–3 p)	Ballymacash Rangers (NL)
Suffolk (NL)	3–0	St Luke's (NL)
Trojans (NL)	3–1	Desertmartin (NL)
Tullyvallen (NL)	2–2 (3–4 p)	Dunloy (NL)
Wakehurst (NL)	3–1	Ards Rangers (NL)
Woodvale (NL)	5–1	Windmill Stars (NL)

Byes

18th Newtownabbey Old Boys (NL)
Aquinas (NL)
Ballymoney United (NL)
Brantwood (NL)
Crewe United (NL)
Dollingstown (3)
Dunmurry Young Men (NL)
Greenisland (NL)
Hanover (NL)
Immaculata (NL)
Islandmagee (NL)
Larne Tech Old Boys (NL)
Lisburn Distillery (3)
Lisburn Rangers (NL)
Lower Maze (NL)
Newtowne (NL)
Oxford United Stars (NL)
Portstewart (3)
Rathfriland Rangers (NL)
Richhill (NL)
Shankill United (NL)
Shorts (NL)
Strabane Athletic (NL)
Tandragee Rovers (NL)
Tobermore United (3)
Tullycarnet (NL)
Valley Rangers (NL)

=== Second round ===
64 clubs entered the second round – the 37 first round winners along with the 27 byes. The matches were played on 27 and 28 September 2019. Crumlin Star and Hanover automatically advanced to the third round, after their opponents Trojans and Oxford United Stars both withdrew from the competition.

Team 1	Score	Team 2
27 September 2019
Glebe Rangers (NL)	1–1 (aet) (3–4 p)	Chimney Corner (NL)
28 September 2019
Aquinas (NL)	2–1	Craigavon City (NL)
Ardstraw (NL)	4–1	Wakehurst (NL)
Armagh City (3)	2–1 (aet)	Dunloy (NL)
Ballymacash Rangers (NL)	2–1	Dunmurry Young Men (NL)
Ballymoney United (NL)	2–3	East Belfast (NL)
Banbridge Rangers (NL)	0–3	Bangor (3)
Brantwood (NL)	4–3 (aet)	Moyola Park (3)
Comber Recreation (NL)	2–4	Coagh United (NL)
Crewe United (NL)	3–4	Crumlin United (NL)
Dollingstown (3)	5–0	Lower Maze (NL)
Dunmurry Rec. (NL)	3–2	Newbuildings United (NL)
Greenisland (NL)	2–0	Albert Foundry (NL)
Islandmagee (NL)	5–2	Shorts (NL)

Team 1	Score	Team 2
Killyleagh Youth (NL)	1–0	Downshire Young Men (NL)
Limavady United (3)	2–0	Immaculata (NL)
Lisburn Distillery (3)	3–2	Strabane Athletic (NL)
Lurgan Town (NL)	0–4	St James' Swifts (NL)
Maiden City (NL)	1–3	Tullycarnet (NL)
Moneyslane (NL)	9–0	Mossley (NL)
Newcastle (NL)	0–5	Banbridge Town (3)
Newtowne (NL)	0–2	Newington (3)
Portstewart (3)	0–1	Belfast Celtic (NL)
Rathfriland Rangers (NL)	4–2	Seagoe (NL)
Richhill (NL)	0–3	Valley Rangers (NL)
Shankill United (NL)	1–4	Lisburn Rangers (NL)
Suffolk (NL)	1–4	Larne Tech Old Boys (NL)
Tandragee Rovers (NL)	5–7 (aet)	18th Newtownabbey Old Boys (NL)
Tobermore United (3)	7–1	Oxford Sunnyside (NL)
Woodvale (NL)	1–7	Annagh United (3)

=== Third round ===
The 30 second round winners entered the third round along with the two byes. The matches were played on 2 November 2019.

Team 1	Score	Team 2
18th Newtownabbey Old Boys (NL)	2–3	Coagh United (NL)
Ardstraw (NL)	1–2	Islandmagee (NL)
Banbridge Town (3)	2–1	Dunmurry Rec. (NL)
Belfast Celtic (NL)	3–1	Annagh United (3)
Brantwood (NL)	4–3	Crumlin United (NL)
Chimney Corner (NL)	0–3	Valley Rangers (NL)
Crumlin Star (NL)	1–0	Greenisland (NL)
Dollingstown (3)	2–1	Lisburn Distillery (3)
Hanover (NL)	3–2	Killyleagh Youth (NL)
Limavady United (3)	3–0	Aquinas (NL)
Moneyslane (NL)	1–5	Bangor (3)
Newington (3)	0–3	East Belfast (NL)
Rathfriland Rangers (NL)	3–0	Lisburn Rangers (NL)
St James' Swifts (NL)	0–4	Ballymacash Rangers (NL)
Tobermore United (3)	1–3	Larne Tech Old Boys (NL)
Tullycarnet (NL)	4–3	Armagh City (3)

=== Fourth round ===
The 16 third round winners entered the fourth round. The matches were played on 30 November 2019.

Team 1	Score	Team 2
Banbridge Town (3)	3–2	Ballymacash Rangers (NL)
Belfast Celtic (NL)	2–1	Larne Tech Old Boys (NL)
Brantwood (NL)	2–5	Rathfriland Rangers (NL)
Coagh United (NL)	0–1	Crumlin Star (NL)
Dollingstown (3)	6–0	Tullycarnet (NL)
East Belfast (NL)	7–1	Islandmagee (NL)
Limavady United (3)	1–3	Bangor (3)
Valley Rangers (NL)	1–5	Hanover (NL)

=== Fifth round ===
32 clubs entered the fifth round. The 24 clubs from the NIFL Premiership and NIFL Championship entered the competition at this stage, and were joined by the 8 fourth round winners. The matches were played on 4 January 2020.

Team 1	Score	Team 2
Ards (2)	1–3	Carrick Rangers (1)
Ballinamallard United (2)	1–0	Dollingstown (3)
Ballyclare Comrades (2)	2–1	Harland & Wolff Welders (2)
Ballymena United (1)	2–0	Crumlin Star (NL)
Banbridge Town (3)	2–2 (a.e.t.) (5–4 p)	East Belfast (NL)
Cliftonville (1)	6–0	Hanover (NL)
Crusaders (1)	3–0	Dundela (2)
Glenavon (1)	0–2	Coleraine (1)
Glentoran (1)	2–2 (a.e.t.) (5–4 p)	Portadown (2)
Institute (1)	2–3	Dungannon Swifts (1)
Knockbreda (2)	3–2	Dergview (2)
Larne (1)	8–0	Belfast Celtic (NL)
Loughgall (2)	1–2	Rathfriland Rangers (NL)
Newry City (2)	3–1	Bangor (3)
Queen's University (2)	2–1	Linfield (1)
Warrenpoint Town (1)	3–1	PSNI (2)

=== Sixth round ===
The 16 fifth round winners entered the sixth round. The matches were played on 1 February 2020.

Team 1	Score	Team 2
Ballyclare Comrades (2)	0–1	Larne (1)
Carrick Rangers (1)	1–5	Crusaders (1)
Cliftonville (1)	3–1	Rathfriland Rangers (NL)
Coleraine (1)	3–0	Banbridge Town (3)
Dungannon Swifts (1)	4–2	Newry City (2)
Knockbreda (2)	2–5	Ballinamallard United (2)
Queen's University (2)	2–3	Glentoran (1)
Warrenpoint Town (1)	1–2	Ballymena United (1)

=== Quarter-finals ===
The 8 sixth round winners entered the quarter-finals, which were played on 28 and 29 February 2020.

Team 1	Score	Team 2
Ballinamallard United (2)	0–2	Ballymena United (1)
Dungannon Swifts (1)	1–2	Cliftonville (1)
Glentoran (1)	2–1	Crusaders (1)
Larne (1)	2–3	Coleraine (1)

=== Semi-finals ===
The four quarter-final winners entered the semi-finals, which were originally scheduled to be played on 28 March 2020. However, as a result of the COVID-19 pandemic in Northern Ireland, the semi-finals were postponed until 27 July 2020.

Team 1	Score	Team 2
Ballymena United (1)	1–1 (a.e.t.) (3–1 p)	Coleraine (1)
Cliftonville (1)	1–1 (a.e.t.) (6–7 p)	Glentoran (1)

=== Final ===
The 2 semi-final winners entered the final. The final was originally scheduled to be played in May 2020 at Windsor Park. However, as a result of the COVID-19 pandemic in Northern Ireland, the final was postponed until 31 July 2020. One of the first football matches in the United Kingdom to be played in front of fans since the beginning of the pandemic, the match ended with Glentoran defeating Ballymena United 2–1 after extra-time to win the Cup for the 23rd time, with goals coming from Paul O'Neill and Robbie McDaid.

31 July 2020

Ballymena United (1)	1 – 2 (a.e.t.)	Glentoran (1)
Friel 48'	Report	O'Neill 22'; McDaid 115'

Windsor Park, Belfast
Attendance: 500
