= 2022–23 Irish Cup =

2022–23 Irish football Cup

Tournament details
- Country: Northern Ireland
- Dates: 13 Aug 2022 – 7 May 2023
- Teams: 128 (incl. qualifying); 32 (main competition)

Final positions
- Champions: Crusaders (6th title)
- Runners-up: Ballymena United

Tournament statistics
- Matches played: 120
- Goals scored: 507 (4.23 per match)

The 2022–23 Irish Cup (known as the Samuel Gelston's Whiskey Irish Cup for sponsorship purposes) was the 143rd edition of the Irish Cup, the premier knockout cup competition in Northern Irish football since its inauguration in 1881. The winners qualified for the 2023–24 Europa Conference League first qualifying round.

Crusaders won the cup on 7 May 2023 with a 4–0 win over Ballymena United (a repeat of the previous season's final), their second consecutive Irish Cup win and third overall.

== Results ==
The league tier of each club at the time of entering the competition is listed in parentheses.

- (1) = NIFL Premiership
- (2) = NIFL Championship
- (3) = NIFL Premier Intermediate League
- (NL) = Non-league (clubs outside the Northern Ireland Football League – levels 4–7)

=== First round ===
101 clubs entered the first round of the main competition, with the first round draw being made on 7 July 2022. The matches were played on 13 August 2022.

Team 1	Score	Team 2
1st Bangor Old Boys (NL)	2–3	Finaghy (NL)
Abbey Villa (NL)	3–0	Ballynahinch Olympic (NL)
Albert Foundry (NL)	1–0	Tobermore United (3)
Ards Rangers (NL)	2–3	Lurgan Town (NL)
Armagh City (3)	1–4	Willowbank (NL)
Ballymacash Rangers (3)	5–0	Kilmore Recreation (NL)
Ballynure Old Boys	1–5	St James' Swifts (NL)
Banbridge Town (3)	9–0	Ballynahinch United (NL)
Bangor (3)	2–0	Queen's University (3)
Bourneview Mill (NL)	3–0	Lisburn Distillery (3)
Coagh United (NL)	3–2	Crumlin Star (NL)
Desertmartin (NL)	2–4	St Mary's Youth (NL)
Dollingstown (3)	1–0	Larne Tech Old Boys (NL)
Donegal Celtic (NL)	1–2	Belfast Celtic (NL)
Dromara Village (NL)	1–2	Richhill (NL)
Dunloy (NL)	3–0	Brantwood (NL)
Dunmurry Recreation (NL)	0–5	Immaculata (NL)
East Belfast (NL)	4–4 (7–6p)	Rathfriland Rangers (NL)
Fivemiletown United (NL)	4–0	Bangor Amateurs (NL)
Grove United (NL)	2–1	Portstewart (3)
Islandmagee (NL)	4–0	Dunmurry Young Men (NL)
Limavady United (3)	w/o	Banbridge Rangers (NL)
Lisburn Rangers (NL)	3–2	Rosemount Recreation (NL)
Lower Maze (NL)	2–6	Greenisland (NL)
Markethill Swifts (NL)	5–5 (4–2p)	Drumaness Mills (NL)
Moneyslane (NL)	1–6	Crewe United (NL)
Moyola Park (3)	5–0	Tullyvallen (3)
Newbuildings United (NL)	4–4 (4–2p)	Wellington Recreation (NL)
Newtowne (NL)	0–2	Shankill United (NL)
PSNI (3)	0–2	Comber Recreation (NL)
Saintfield United (NL)	0–4	Wakehurst (NL)
Seagoe (NL)	1–4	Oxford Sunnyside (NL)
Strabane Athletic (NL)	2–0	Cookstown Youth (NL)
Suffolk (NL)	1–2	Orangefield Old Boys (NL)
Tandragee Rovers (NL)	5–0	Downshire Young Men (NL)
Tullycarnet (NL)	1–3	Holywood (NL)
Valley Rangers (NL)	7–4	Shorts (NL)

=== Second round ===
The second round draw was made on 17 August 2022. The matches were played on 17 September 2022.

Team 1	Score	Team 2
18th Newtownabbey Old Boys (NL)	0–2	St James' Swifts (NL)
Ambassadors (NL)	1–5	Finaghy (NL)
Ballymacash Rangers (3)	10–0	Bryansburn Rangers (NL)
Ballymoney United (NL)	w/o	Killyleagh Youth (NL)
Banbridge Town (3)	4–1	Fivemiletown United (NL)
Bangor (3)	4–0	Strabane Athletic (NL)
Belfast Celtic (NL)	6–1	Maiden City (NL)
Coagh United (NL)	6–0	Craigavon City (NL)
Comber Recreation (NL)	5–1	Chimney Corner (NL)
Crumlin United (NL)	11–0	AFC Craigavon (NL)
Greenisland (NL)	2–1	Hanover (NL)
Holywood (NL)	1–3	Crewe United (NL)
Immaculata (NL)	w/o	Barn United (NL)
Laurelvale (NL)	0–6	St Mary's Youth (NL)
Lisburn Rangers (NL)	1–4	Dollingstown (3)
Malachians (NL)	0–4	Bourneview Mill (NL)
Markethill Swifts (NL)	1–2	East Belfast (NL)
Mossley (NL)	6–1	Dromore Amateurs (NL)
Moyola Park (3)	1–0	Abbey Villa (NL)
Newbuildings United (NL)	2–2 (3–4p)	Dunloy (NL)
Newcastle (NL)	2–1	Colin Valley (NL)
Newmills (NL)	1–6	Willowbank (NL)
Orangefield Old Boys (NL)	1–5	Limavady United (3)
Oxford Sunnyside (NL)	6–2	St Oliver Plunkett (NL)
Portaferry Rovers (NL)	2–2 (1–3p)	Dungiven Celtic (NL)
Rosario Youth (NL)	5–0	Sirocco Works (NL)
Shankill United (NL)	3–3 (3–0p)	Valley Rangers (NL)
St Luke's (NL)	0–2	Lurgan Town (NL)
Tandragee Rovers (NL)	3–2	Richhill (NL)
Wakehurst (NL)	3–2	Albert Foundry (NL)
Windmill Stars (NL)	5–0	Islandmagee (NL)
Woodvale (NL)	3–0	Grove United (NL)

=== Third round ===
The third round draw was made on 20 September 2022. The matches were played on 29 October and 5 November 2022.

Team 1	Score	Team 2
29 October 2022
Ballymacash Rangers (3)	7–1	Rosario Youth (NL)
Bourneview Mill (NL)	2–0	Shankill United (NL)
Coagh United (NL)	1–5	Crumlin United (NL)
Comber Recreation (NL)	0–2	Dollingstown (3)
Crewe United (NL)	2–2 (2–1p)	St James' Swifts (NL)
Dungiven Celtic (NL)	0–6	Ballymoney United (NL)
Greenisland (NL)	2–0	Dunloy (NL)
Newcastle (NL)	1–5	St Mary's Youth (NL)
Oxford Sunnyside (NL)	2–1	Mossley (NL)
Tandragee Rovers (NL)	2–0	Immaculata (NL)
Wakehurst (NL)	1–5	Moyola Park (3)
Windmill Stars (NL)	3–2	Willowbank (NL)
Woodvale (NL)	0–1	Limavady United (3)
5 November 2022
Banbridge Town (3)	1–0	East Belfast (NL)
Belfast Celtic (NL)	0–3	Bangor (3)
Lurgan Town (NL)	1–3	Finaghy (NL)

=== Fourth round ===
The fourth round draw was made on 1 November 2022. The matches were played on 26 November 2022.

Team 1	Score	Team 2
Ballymacash Rangers (3)	3–5	Banbridge Town (3)
Ballymoney United (NL)	2–0	Finaghy (NL)
Bourneview Mill (NL)	1–6	Moyola Park (3)
Crewe United (NL)	1–3	St Mary's Youth (NL)
Crumlin United (NL)	2–0	Greenisland (NL)
Limavady United (3)	1–2	Bangor (3)
Tandragee Rovers (NL)	3–1	Oxford Sunnyside (NL)
Windmill Stars (NL)	2–3	Dollingstown (3)

=== Fifth round ===
The fifth round draw was made on 6 December 2022. The matches were played on 6 and 7 January 2023.

Team 1	Score	Team 2
Ballinamallard United (2)	1–2	Glenavon (1)
Ballyclare Comrades (2)	1–0	Dollingstown (3)
Bangor (3)	4–0	Tandragee Rovers (NL)
Carrick Rangers (1)	1–1 (0–3p)	Ballymena United (1)
Coleraine (1)	3–1	Loughgall (2)
Crusaders (1)	6–0	Dergview (2)
Dundela (2)	0–5	Cliftonville (1)
Dungannon Swifts (1)	3–1	Ards (2)
Institute (2)	4–0	Annagh United (2)
Knockbreda (2)	2–0	St Mary's Youth (NL)
Larne (1)	3–0	Crumlin United (NL)
Linfield (1)	3–0	Warrenpoint Town (2)
Moyola Park (3)	0–2	Glentoran (1)
Newington (2)	2–1	Ballymoney United (NL)
Newry City (1)	1–2	Harland & Wolff Welders (2)
Portadown (1)	2–0	Banbridge Town (3)

=== Sixth round ===
The sixth round draw was made on 7 January 2023. The matches were played on 3 and 4 February 2023.

Team 1	Score	Team 2
Ballymena United (1)	4–1	Newington (2)
Bangor (3)	1–2	Crusaders (1)
Cliftonville (1)	2–2 (3–1p)	Coleraine (1)
Glenavon (1)	0–1	Harland & Wolff Welders (2)
Institute (2)	0–1	Ballyclare Comrades (2)
Knockbreda (2)	1–2	Dungannon Swifts (1)
Larne (1)	1–1 (4–3p)	Linfield (1)
Portadown (1)	0–3	Glentoran (1)

=== Quarter-finals ===
The 8 sixth round winners entered the quarter-finals. The draw was made on 4 February 2023, and the matches were played on 3 and 4 March 2023.

Team 1	Score	Team 2
Ballyclare Comrades (2)	1–3	Ballymena United (1)
Cliftonville (1)	1–2	Dungannon Swifts (1)
Crusaders (1)	1–0	Glentoran (1)
Harland & Wolff Welders (2)	0–1	Larne (1)

=== Semi-finals ===
The 4 quarter-final winners entered the semi-finals. The draw was made on 8 March 2023, and the matches will be played on 31 March and 1 April 2023.

Team 1	Score	Team 2
Dungannon Swifts (1)	0–1	Crusaders (1)
Larne (1)	0–2	Ballymena United (1)

=== Final ===
Ballymena United and Crusaders qualified to the final for the second consecutive year and their second Irish Cup final against each other. Crusaders won 2–1 in the previous season's final. The final was held on 7 May 2023 and ended with a 4-0 win for Crusaders.

7 May 2023
14:30 BST

Ballymena United (1)	0–4	Crusaders (1)
	BBC Sport	Clarke 12'; Lecky 53'; Lowry 65'; Heatley 69'

Windsor Park, Belfast
Attendance: 9,688
Referee: Tim Marshall
