= 2011–12 Irish Cup =

Tournament details
- Country: Northern Ireland
- Teams: 116

Final positions
- Champions: Linfield (42nd win)
- Runners-up: Crusaders

Tournament statistics
- Matches played: 119
- Goals scored: 493 (4.14 per match)

The 2011–12 Irish Cup (known as the JJB Sports Irish Cup for sponsorship reasons) was the 132nd edition of the Irish Cup, Northern Ireland's premier football knock-out cup competition.. The competition began on 17 September 2011 with the first round and ended on 5 May 2012 with the final.

Linfield were the defending champions, after a 2–1 victory over Crusaders in last season's final. The two clubs met again in this season's final, and Linfield successfully defended the cup to win it for the sixth time in seven seasons after defeating Crusaders 4–1. Crusaders qualified for the first qualifying round of the 2012–13 UEFA Europa League as Linfield had already qualified for the UEFA Champions League by winning the 2011–12 IFA Premiership.

== Results ==
=== First round ===
The draw for the first round was held on 1 September 2011. Ards Rangers, Broomhedge, Lower Maze, Newington Youth Club, Rathfriland Rangers and Sirocco Works all received a bye into the Second Round. Matches were played on 17 and 24 September 2011.

Team 1	Score	Team 2
1st Bangor Old Boys	2–0	Drumaness Mills
Abbey Villa	6–0	Groomsport
Banbridge Rangers	2–0	Ardstraw
Bangor Rangers	3–3 (1–4 p)	Rathfern Rangers
Bangor Swifts	4–1	Richhill
Barn United	3–4	Holywood
Bloomfield	0–1	Draperstown Celtic
Bourneview Young Men	2–9	Immaculata
Bryansburn Rangers	5–3	Ballywalter Recreation
Carniny Amateurs	3–2	Saintfield United
Comber Recreation	1–1 (2–4 p)	Ballynahinch United
Crumlin Star	5–0	Lisburn Rangers
Desertmartin	1–5	Brantwood
Downpatrick	2–0	Mossley
Dromara Village	7–1	18th Newtownabbey Old Boys
Dromore Amateurs	3–5	Shorts
Dungiven	1–2	Mountjoy United
East Belfast	4–1	Shankill United
Grove United	0–3	Tandragee Rovers
Islandmagee	4–0	Dunmurry Young Men
Iveagh United	2–1	Craigavon
Killyleagh Youth	2–3	Albert Foundry
Kilmore Recreation	5–5 (2–4 p)	Derriaghy Cricket Club
Kilroot Recreation	1–2	Newcastle
Larne Tech Old Boys	4–2	Seagoe
Lurgan Town Boys	0–2	Raceview
Magherafelt Sky Blues	2–0	Crewe United
Malachians	3–6	Crumlin United
Newbuildings United	9–1	Hanover
Nortel	1–2	Lisanally Rangers
Rosario Youth Club	2–0	Downshire Young Men
Strabane & Sion Swifts United	4–2	Ballynure Old Boys
UUJ	4–7	Dunmurry Recreation
Wellington Recreation	2–1	Dollingstown

Source: irishfa.com

=== Second round ===
The games were played on 22 October 2011.

Team 1	Score	Team 2
1st Bangor Old Boys	4–3	Strabane & Sion Swifts United
Abbey Villa	1–2	Crumlin Star
Ballynahinch United	3–2	Crumlin United
Bangor Swifts	2–5	Dromara Village
Bryansburn Rangers	2–4	Albert Foundry
Carniny Amateurs	3–5	Newbuildings United
Derriaghy Cricket Club	4–1	Raceview
Downpatrick	4–2	Brantwood
East Belfast	0–1	Sirocco Works
Holywood	2–5	Ards Rangers
Iveagh United	5–2	Broomhedge
Lisanally Rangers	1–4	Larne Tech Old Boys
Magherafelt Sky Blues	0–1	Immaculata
Mountjoy United	2–2 (5–3p)	Newcastle
Rathfern Rangers	0–2	Newington Youth Club
Rathfriland Rangers	3–2	Draperstown Celtic
Rosario Youth Club	1–2	Bangridge Rangers
Shorts	2–3	Dunmurry Recreation
Tandragee Rovers	0–1	Islandmagee
Wellington Recreation	3–1	Lower Maze

Source: irishfa.com

=== Third round ===
The games were played on 19 November 2011.

Team 1	Score	Team 2
Ards Rangers	3–1	Albert Foundry
Derriaghy Cricket Club	1–0	Ballynahinch United
Dunmurry Recreation	4–0	1st Bangor Old Boys
Immaculata	2–0	Crumlin Star
Larne Tech Old Boys	2–0	Downpatrick
Mountjoy United	0–3	Bangridge Rangers
Newbuildings United	6–1	Dromara Village
Newington Youth Club	4–3	Sirocco Works
Rathfriland Rangers	1–1 (4–3p)	Islandmagee
Wellington Recreation	1–2	Iveagh United

Source: irishfa.com

=== Fourth round ===
All 30 clubs from IFA Championship 1 and 2 entered the competition at this stage, as well as the 10 lower league clubs that had progressed through the previous rounds. The games were played on 10 and 17 December 2011.

Team 1	Score	Team 2
Ards	3−0	Annagh United
Ards Rangers	2–2 (3–5p)	Dunmurry Recreation
Armagh City	0–3	Newbuildings United
Banbridge Town	4−1	Immaculata
Coagh United	1−0	Bangridge Rangers
Dergview	5–1	Knockbreda
Dundela	2−0	Wakehurst
Glebe Rangers	0−3	Newington Youth Club
Harland & Wolff Welders	0−1	Warrenpoint Town
Institute	2−0	Limavady United
Iveagh United	1−4	Ballymoney United
Killymoon Rangers	3−1	Moyola Park
Larne Tech Old Boys	6–1	Rathfriland Rangers
Loughgall	5−0	Chimney Corner
Lurgan Celtic	1−2	Ballyclare Comrades
Newry City	6–1	Sport & Leisure Swifts
Portstewart	0−3	Bangor
PSNI	0−3	Larne
Queen's University	0–2	Derriaghy Cricket Club
Tobermore United	1−3	Ballinamallard United

Source: irishfa.com

=== Fifth round ===
The draw for the Fifth Round was made on 14 December 2011. All 12 clubs from the IFA Premiership entered at this stage, along with the 20 winners from the fourth round matches. The games were played on 14 January 2012. Replays were played on 24 January 2012.

Team 1	Score	Team 2
Banbridge Town	0−1	Newry City
Bangor	2−4	Ballymoney United
Cliftonville	2−0	Ards
Coagh United	2−2	Loughgall
Coleraine	3−2	Larne Tech Old Boys
Crusaders	3−0	Warrenpoint Town
Dergview	0−1	Derriaghy Cricket Club
Dundela	0−3	Ballinamallard United
Dungannon Swifts	3−1	Larne
Glenavon	2−1	Portadown
Glentoran	0−1	Newington Youth Club
Institute	1−1	Donegal Celtic
Killymoon Rangers	1−3	Carrick Rangers
Linfield	7−1	Ballyclare Comrades
Lisburn Distillery	1−2	Ballymena United
Newbuildings United	4−1	Dunmurry Recreation
Replays
Donegal Celtic	1–0	Institute
Loughgall	1–2	Coagh United

Source: irishfa.com

=== Sixth round ===
The games were played on 11 February 2012.

Team 1	Score	Team 2
Ballymena United	3–1	Derriaghy Cricket Club
Ballymoney United	1–6	Newry City
Coagh United	1–1	Newbuildings United
Coleraine	3–0	Ballinamallard United
Donegal Celtic	1–0	Cliftonville
Dungannon Swifts	3–0	Newington Youth Club
Glenavon	0–4	Crusaders
Linfield	5–1	Carrick Rangers
Replays
Coagh United	4–1	Newbuildings United

Source: irishfa.com

=== Quarter-finals ===
The quarter-finals were played on 3 March 2012, with the replay played on 12 March 2012.

3 March 2012
15:00 GMT

Coleraine	0 – 2	Crusaders
	Report	Morrow 36'; Snoddy 90'

The Showgrounds, Coleraine

3 March 2012
15:00 GMT

Donegal Celtic	1 – 1	Dungannon Swifts
Henderson 47'	Report	Forker 85'

Donegal Celtic Park, Belfast

3 March 2012
15:00 GMT

Linfield	4 – 0	Coagh United
Lowry 26'; Thompson 28', 68', 74'	Report

Windsor Park, Belfast

3 March 2012
15:00 GMT

Newry City	1 – 2	Ballymena United^{†}
Haveron 45'	Report	McCutcheon 6'; Davidson 76'

The Showgrounds, Newry

^{†}Ballymena United were later ejected from the competition for fielding an ineligible player in this match. Newry City were consequently reinstated. Ballymena United appealed the decision, but the appeal was rejected.

==== Replay ====
12 March 2012
19:45 GMT

Dungannon Swifts	1 – 0	Donegal Celtic
Lavery 59'	Report

Stangmore Park, Dungannon

=== Semi-finals ===
The semi-final draw was made on 3 March 2012. Both ties were due to be played on 31 March 2012. However, Ballymena United's appeal over their disqualification delayed Linfield's semi-final match until 14 April 2012. Newry City were confirmed as their opponents when Ballymena's appeal was rejected.

31 March 2012
15:00 BST

Dungannon Swifts	0 – 1	Crusaders
	Report	Rainey 71'

Mourneview Park, Lurgan

14 April 2012
15:00 BST

Newry City	0 – 7	Linfield
	Report	Thompson 7', 27', 39', 82' (Pen.); McAllister 21'; Carvill 23'; Mulgrew 80'

The Oval, Belfast

=== Final ===
The final took place on 5 May 2012 at Windsor Park.

5 May 2012
14:30 BST

Crusaders	1 – 4	Linfield
Coates 56'	Report	McAllister 28', 41'; Carvill 60'; Mulgrew 83'

Windsor Park, Belfast
Attendance: 7,325
Referee: Raymond Crangle
