= Gary Hamilton (footballer, born 1980) =

Northern Irish footballer (born 1980)

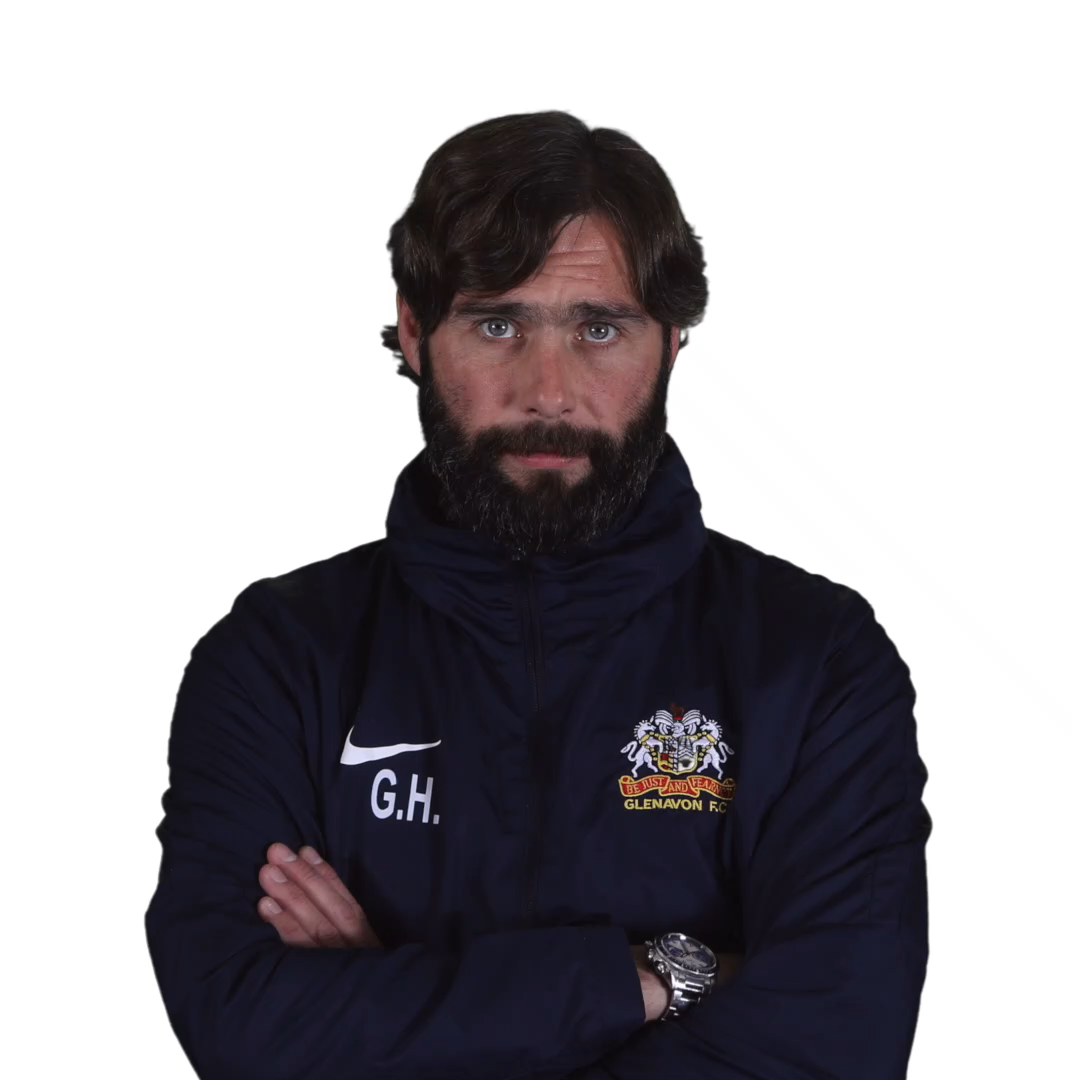
- Hamilton as Glenavon manager in 2020

Personal information
- Date of birth: 6 October 1980 (age 46)
- Place of birth: Waringstown, Northern Ireland
- Position: Striker

Senior career*
Years	Team	Apps	(Gls)
1997–2000	Blackburn Rovers	1	(0)
2000–2001	→ Rochdale (loan)	3	(0)
2001	Raufoss IL	7	(2)
2001–2006	Portadown	140	(79)
2006–2011	Glentoran	132	(70)
2010–2011	→ Glenavon (loan)	20	(12)
2011–2023	Glenavon	184	(33)
2023–2024	Hill Street	1	(0)
Total		488	(196)

International career
2000–2001	Northern Ireland U21	12	(3)
2003–2004	Northern Ireland	5	(0)

Managerial career
- 2011–2023: Glenavon (player-manager)
- 2025–: Ballymacash Rangers
- * Club domestic league appearances and goals

Gary Hamilton (born 6 October 1980) is a Northern Irish football manager and former footballer. He is manager of NIFL Premier Intermediate League side Ballymacash Rangers. Hamilton was player-manager of NIFL Premiership side Glenavon from 2011 to 2023.

== Career ==
Hamilton currently holds the Irish Premiership record for the number of goals scored in a match, scoring six for Portadown against Omagh Town in October 2004.

In 2006, he moved to Glentoran, having previously played for Portadown, Raufoss IL, Rochdale and Blackburn Rovers. He gained five international caps between 2003 and 2004, having previously represented Northern Ireland at every other level.

He scored for Glentoran in the Europa League in July 2010, before moving to Glenavon on a season-long loan where he made an immediate impact, scoring nine goals in ten competitive starts winning Carling Player of the Month for December 2010.

Hamilton is a Glenavon and Everton fan.

He joined his hometown club, Glenavon, on a season-long loan for the 2010–11 season. He signed a new deal with Glentoran in August 2011.

=== Managerial career ===
On 15 December 2011, Hamilton was appointed player-manager of Glenavon after the resignation of Marty Quinn. His first match in charge was on 17 December 2011, against Linfield at Windsor Park. Linfield won the match 1–0.

However, his first win in charge came in the very next game, as the Lurgan Blues defeated Crusaders 3–2 at Mourneview Park on 20 December 2011.

In 2014, Hamilton guided Glenavon to victory in the 2013–14 Irish Cup, the clubs first winning campaign in the tournament since 1997. He repeated this success in 2016, defeating David Healy's Linfield 2–0 in the final.

On 4 March 2021, Hamilton signed a three-year extension to his contract at Glenavon. The extension granted Hamilton to stay at the club until the end of the 2024/25 season. Following a difficult start to the 2023–24 season, Gary departed as manager on 13 September 2023.

On 26 June 2025, it was announced that Hamilton had returned to football management with NIFL Premier Intermediate League side Ballymacash Rangers. Hamilton made club history in his first six months in charge of Ballymacash Rangers, winning the 2025/26 Steel and Sons Cup on 25th December 2025. His Ballymacash Rangers side defeated Holywood FC on penalties (4-2) after the game finished 1-1.

== Honours ==
Portadown

- Irish League: 2001–02
- Irish Cup: 2004–05

Glentoran

- Irish League/IFA Premiership: 2008–09
- Irish League Cup: 2006–07, 2009–10
- County Antrim Shield: 2007–08, 2010–11

Glenavon

- Irish Cup: 2013–14, 2015–16
- Mid-Ulster Cup: 2010–11, 2017–18, 2018–19, 2020-21

Ballymacash Rangers

- Steel and Sons Cup: 2025-26
