= Kevin Braniff =

Northern Irish footballer

Personal information
- Full name: Kevin Robert Braniff
- Date of birth: 4 March 1983 (age 43)
- Place of birth: Belfast, Northern Ireland
- Height: 5 ft 11 in (1.80 m)
- Positions: Striker; midfielder

Team information
- Current team: St James Swifts

Youth career
- ?–2000: Millwall

Senior career*
Years	Team	Apps	(Gls)
2000–2006	Millwall	55	(5)
2004	→ Rushden & Diamonds (loan)	12	(3)
2004–2005	→ Canvey Island (loan)	4	(1)
2006–2014	Portadown	204	(81)
2014	Port Melbourne Sharks	8	(4)
2014–2017	Glenavon	70	(26)
2017–2018	Ballymena United	27	(5)
2018–2019	Portadown		
2019	Lisburn Distillery	5	(2)
2020–	St James Swifts		

International career^{‡}
2002–2005	Northern Ireland U21	11	(1)
2004	Northern Ireland U23	1	(0)
2010	Northern Ireland	2	(0)
- * Club domestic league appearances and goals as of 17:36, 10 May 2018 (UTC) ‡ National team caps and goals as of 22:03, 17 November 2013 (UTC)

Kevin Robert Braniff (born 4 March 1983) is a Northern Irish association football player who currently is playing for St James Swifts. He has been capped by Northern Ireland.

== Career ==
=== Club career ===
He started his career with Millwall. Although he scored on his debut against Brighton & Hove Albion, he never established himself in the Lions' starting XI. He contributed to Millwall's run to the 2004 FA Cup Final; scoring in the third round win over Walsall. He was sent out on loan to Rushden and Diamonds and Canvey Island in the 2004–05 season. His last appearance for Millwall was against Northampton in September, with his last goal coming against Gillingham in August.

He was then snapped up by Northern Irish club, Portadown in December 2006. Even though Portadown were sent down to the Northern Irish Championship, Braniff opted to stay. Braniff helped Portadown gain promotion back to the Northern Ireland Premiership and, in the 2009–10 season, he signed a three-year contract with Portadown in January 2010 after lengthy contract negotiations. During his time at Portadown, Braniff garnered plaudits from local football fans and journalists alike, and was considered to be one of the most technically gifted players of the Irish League's recent times.

On 13 November 2013, when Ballymena beat Portadown 4–0, Braniff threw his tracksuit away and was fined. Braniff vowed never to play for Portadown under the management of Ronnie McFall again, and was placed on the transfer list. On 18 January, it was confirmed that he would be going to Melbourne to undergo a trial with Port Melbourne Sharks in the Australian National League. He departed for Australia on 5 February. The trial was successful, though Braniff would ultimately return to Northern Ireland to sign for Portadown's Mid-Ulster Derby rivals, and 2014 Irish Cup winners Glenavon on 12 June 2014. His debut season for the Lurgan Blues was a successful one, with his 18 league goals being instrumental to Glenavon attaining European football for the next season.

Injury was to impact Braniff's 2015–16 season, and the scintillating form of new arrival Daniel Kearns meant that Braniff initially struggled to regain a first team spot. However, a mooted swap deal for Glentoran defender Calum Birney in the January transfer window came to nothing, as Braniff gradually returned to the starting XI. On 1 April, Braniff scored 4 goals in a stunning 4–3 Irish Cup semi-final victory against Crusaders, and again demonstrated his late-season form by scoring the opening goal in an eventual 2–0 win over Linfield in the Irish Cup Final. Two days before the final, Braniff had signed a one-year deal at Glenavon, keeping him at the club until 2017.

January 2017 Braniff signed for Ballymena United, scoring two goals on his debut in the Irish cup. His last minute goal secured a place in the Europa League Play-Offs for the first time in the club's history.

=== International career ===
He made his full debut for Northern Ireland on 26 May 2010 against Turkey in a friendly.
