= Newington Rangers F.C. =

Association football club in Northern Ireland

Newington Rangers
- Full name: Newington Rangers Football Club
- Nickname(s): Rangers
- Founded: 1920
- Ground: The Knowe, Magheramourne
- Capacity: 1,000
- Chairman: Stephen McClean
- Manager: Richard Girvin
- League: Ballymena & Provincial League

Newington Rangers Football Club is a Northern Irish junior-level Football Club. After leaving Division 2A other Northern Amateur Football League (NAFL) in 2019, they are now playing in the Ballymena and Provincial Football League Junior Division 2. Its home ground is "the Knowe", Magheramourne in Larne, County Antrim. The club joined the Amateur League in 1990. The team is currently managed by Richard Girvin

The club previously held intermediate status and played in the Irish Cup. However they were relegated back to junior level in 2016 after finishing bottom of Division 1C of the NAFL.

== Club officials ==
- Chairman of the Board: Stephen McClean
- '1st Team Manager: Richard Girvin

== Honours ==
=== Intermediate honours ===
- McElroy Cup: 1
  - 1930–31
