= St Patrick's Young Men F.C. =

Association football club in Northern Ireland

St Patrick's Young Men
- Full name: St Patrick's Young Men Football Club
- Founded: 1965
- Ground: Grove Playing Fields, Belfast

St Patrick's Young Men Football Club is a Northern Irish, junior football club based in Belfast, playing in Division 2A of the Northern Amateur Football League. The club, founded in 1965 as Peter Pan, and originally based in west Belfast, has been a member of the Amateur League since 2009. Club colours are yellow and blue.

The club participates in the Irish Cup.
