= Andrew Waterworth =

Northern Irish footballer

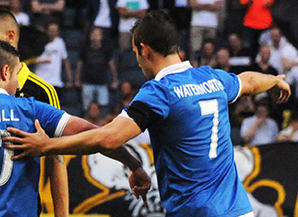

Personal information
- Date of birth: 11 April 1986 (age 40)
- Place of birth: Crossgar, Northern Ireland
- Position: Forward

Youth career
- Kilmore Recreation
- 2002–2004: Glentoran

Senior career*
| Years | Team | Apps | (Gls) |
| 2004–2006 | Ards | 59 | (12) |
| 2004 | → Kilmore Recreation (loan) | ? | (?) |
| 2006–2008 | Lisburn Distillery | 38 | (18) |
| 2008 | Hamilton Academical | 10 | (1) |
| 2008–2013 | Glentoran | 146 | (44) |
| 2013–2021 | Linfield | 257 | (136) |
| 2021–2022 | Glenavon | 25 | (3) |

International career^{‡}
| 2006–2007 | Northern Ireland U21 | 7 | (2) |

Managerial career
- 2023: Northern Ireland women (interim)
- * Club domestic league appearances and goals as of 30 May 2021 ‡ National team caps and goals as of 7 Feb 2008

Andrew Waterworth (born 11 April 1986) is a former footballer from Northern Ireland who was most recently the interim manager of the Northern Ireland women's national team.

== Club career ==
=== Hamilton Academical ===
Waterworth joined Hamilton from Lisburn Distillery in January 2008 for a fee of £20,000. He made his debut against Aberdeen in the Scottish Cup in February.

He scored his first goal for Hamilton against Dundee in April 2008, but returned to Northern Ireland having made only 10 appearances during eight months in Scotland.

=== Glentoran ===
After leaving Hamilton Accies, Waterworth joined Irish Premiership side Glentoran. During his time with the East Belfast side, he won winners medals in both the Irish Premiership and Irish Cup.

On 9 May 2013, Glentoran announced on their website that Waterworth would not be signing a new contract.

=== Linfield ===
In May 2013, Linfield confirmed that they had signed Waterworth on a two-year contract. On his Linfield debut, Waterworth broke a bone in his leg which side-lined the striker for two months. However, he eventually made his league debut for Linfield on 14 September 2013, scoring a hat-trick in a 4–1 win against Ballymena United at Windsor Park, and went on to score 11 goals in his first eleven league appearances to put his side top the table. His first trophy with the Blues arrived in the form of the 2013–14 County Antrim Shield, after a penalty shoot-out victory over Crusaders in the final.

=== Glenavon ===
On 30 May 2021, it was announced that Waterworth, alongside team-mates Mark Haughey and Mark Stafford, had signed for Glenavon on the expiry of their contracts at Linfield. Waterworth made his Glenavon debut coming on as a sub in a 1–1 draw with Portadown, and scored his first goals for the club a week later, notching a brace in a 6–1 victory over Warrenpoint Town.

It was announced on 2 July 2022 that Waterworth had retired from football.

== International career ==
Waterworth was called up to the Northern Ireland under-21 side in January 2008. In total he won seven under-21 caps and scored two goals.

== Managerial career ==
On 16 March 2023, it was announced Waterworth would take charge of the Northern Ireland women's team on an interim basis. Waterworth managed the team for a 4-1 defeat against Wales on 6 April 2023.
