= Ardglass F.C. =

Association football club in Northern Ireland

Ardglass
- Full name: Ardglass Football Club
- Founded: 1973
- Dissolved: 2017
- Ground: St Nicholas
- Chairman: John Beattie
- Manager: Dessie Campbell
- League: Newcastle League

Ardglass Football Club was a Northern Irish junior-level football club playing in the Newcastle & District League. The club hails from Ardglass, County Down, Northern Ireland and was founded in 1973, when it joined the Newcastle & District League before being admitted to the Northern Amateur Football League in 1992. After being relegated from the Premier Division in 2017 the club announced their withdrawal from the Amateur League, citing a lack of players for the decision. The club played in the Irish Cup.
