= Dunloy F.C. =

Association football club in Northern Ireland

Dunloy
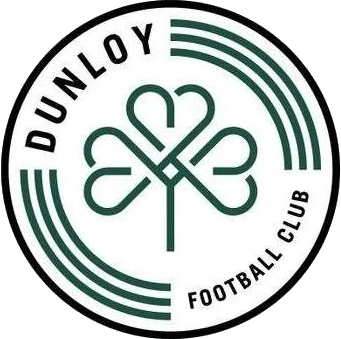
- Full name: Dunloy Football Club
- Founded: 1997
- Ground: McCamphill Park
- Chairman: Vincent Rainey
- Manager: John McFerran and Barry Murphy
- League: Ballymena & Provincial Football League
- 2019/20: Ballymena & Provincial Football League, 1st
Home colours

Dunloy Football Club is a Northern Irish amateur football club based in Dunloy, County Antrim. Currently made up of three teams - First, Reserve and Development. The First Team play in the Premier Division of the Ballymena & Provincial Intermediate League, with both the Reserve and Development Teams competing in the Coleraine and District Saturday Morning League 1 and 2.

Founded in 1997 under the guise Bannview Rovers by Gregory McAuley. They spent ? seasons competing in ?, winning ?. They entered into the Ballymena & Provincial Intermediate League, in ? where the First Team currently compete, with notable players including Piaras 'Suga' McGarry and Peadar McGarrity.

== Honours ==
Dunloy's honours include winning the Ballymena and Provincial Football League in 2019/20, O'Gorman Cup, and McReynolds Cup. Coleraine and District SML Haslett Monumental Sculptors and Glass Craft Premier League.

== Stadium ==
Dunloy play their home games at McCamphill Park, situated on the Tullaghans Road and Bellaghy Road, which is the main through road heading into the village of Dunloy.

Dunloy FC was set up in 1997 by . It plays its home games in the newly laid pitch in Dunloy off the Tullaghans road. The club participates in the Irish Cup.

== History ==
Dunloy applied to join the NIFL Premier Intermediate League for the 2020/21 season. Although having won their league, the club were unsuccessful and were rejected due to inadequate facilities.
