= Valley Rangers F.C. =

Association football club in Northern Ireland

Valley Rangers
- Full name: Valley Rangers Football Club
- Founded: 1973
- Ground: Bignian Park, Kilkeel
- League: Mid-Ulster Football League Intermediate A
- 2015–16: Mid-Ulster Football League Intermediate A, 2nd

Valley Rangers Football Club is a Northern Irish intermediate football club based in Kilkeel, County Down, playing in Intermediate Division A of the Mid-Ulster Football League. The club was founded in 1973. Club colours are blue, white and red.

The club, which is associated with the Mid-Ulster Football Association, participates in the Irish Cup.

== Honours ==
Intermediate B

2014/15 Champions

Marshall Cup

2015/16 Champions

Premier Cup

2016/17 Champions
