= Groomsport F.C. =

Association football club in Northern Ireland

Groomsport
- Full name: Groomsport Football Club
- Nickname: The Port
- Founded: 1974
- Ground: The Meadows, Groomsport
- Capacity: 1,000
- Chairman: Ian Patton
- Manager: Ian McNeill
- League: 2B
- Website: http://www.groomsportfc.co.uk/

Groomsport Football Club is a Northern Irish junior-level football club playing in Division 2B of the Northern Amateur Football League in Northern Ireland. The club was founded in 1974 as Groomsport Old Boys, changing to the current name in 1992. Its home ground is The Meadow in Groomsport, County Down. The reserves compete in NAFL 3D.

== Staff and board members ==
- President : Walter Graham, Billy McAneney
- Vice-President: Paul O'Kane
- Chairman: Ian Patton
- vice-chairman:Alex O’Neill
- Secretary : Chris Galway
- Treasurer : Ian Patton
- Committee Member : Paul McDonnell
- Committee Member : Adam Ellis
- Committee Member : David Williams
- Committee Member :
- Committee Member : Robbie Milling

== Honours ==
=== Junior honours ===
- NAFL Division 2B:
  - 1999/00 2003/04
- NAFL Division 2C:
- 1998/99
