= Ballywalter Recreation F.C. =

Association football club in Northern Ireland

Ballywalter Recreation
- Full name: Ballywalter Recreation Football Club
- Founded: 1977
- Ground: Davidson Park Ballywalter
- League: NAFL Division 1C

Ballywalter Recreation Football Club, referred to as Ballywalter Rec, is a Northern Irish, intermediate football club playing in Division 1B of the Northern Amateur Football League. The club is based in Ballywalter, County Down, and was formed in 1977. The club has played in the Irish Cup.

== Honours ==
=== Junior honours ===
- County Antrim Junior Shield: 2
  - 2000-01, 2007–08
