= Newtowne F.C. =

Association football club in Northern Ireland

Newtowne
- Full name: Newtowne Football Club
- Founded: 1996
- Ground: Scroggy Road
- League: Ballymena & Provincial Football League
- 2018–19: Ballymena & Provincial Football League, 7th

Newtowne Football Club is an intermediate-level football club from Limavady, County Londonderry, playing in the Premier Division of the Ballymena & Provincial League in Northern Ireland.

== Honours ==
=== Intermediate honours ===
- Craig Memorial Cup: 1
  - 2024-25
- Ballymena & Provincial Football League: 2
  - 2012–13, 2015–16
