= Dunmurry Young Men F.C. =

Association football club in Northern Ireland

Dunmurry Young Men
- Full name: Dunmurry Young Men Football Club
- Founded: 1955
- Ground: Napier Park,Dunmurry, Belfast
- League: NAFL Premier

Dunmurry Young Men Football Club is a Northern Irish, intermediate football club playing in the Premier Division of the Northern Amateur Football League. The club is based in Dunmurry in Belfast, and was formed in 1955. The club plays in the Irish Cup.

== Honours ==
- Irish Football Association
  - IFA Junior Cup
  - 1967-68, 1969-70
