= Rathfern Rangers F.C. =

Association football club in Northern Ireland

Rathfern Rangers
- Full name: Rathfern Rangers Football Club
- Nickname(s): Rangers
- Founded: 1974
- Ground: The Diamond Rathcoole,
- Chairman: David McCrea Sr.
- Manager: John Logan
- League: Northern Amateur Football League
Home colours

Rathfern Rangers Football Club is a Northern Irish, intermediate football club playing in Division 1A of the Northern Amateur Football League. The club is based in Newtownabbey, County Antrim and was formed in 1974 and began playing matches in the Dunmurry League. They play their home fixtures at the Diamond, Rathcoole since moving there in 1998. First team manager for the club is John Logan. As well as fielding a first team, Rathfern also have a second team which currently plays in NAFL Division 3A.

== Club history ==
In 1974, Rathfern Rangers was established and admitted to the Dunmurry League. They remained there for 11 years before joining the Northern Ireland Churches League in 1985. Their grounds in the Rathfern estate had deteriorated over the past years so the club moved in 1988 to new grounds at the new Three-Mile Water playing fields and begun a highly successful 10 years of football. By 1998 the club had secured an unprecedented run of five Division 1 champions titles in a row as well as numerous cup victories. They were also honoured by the Irish Football Association when they and Donegal Celtic were jointly presented with the IFA Fair Play Award in 1996.

The 1998–99 season saw the team set another first in the Churches league. Having moved to their own purpose-built ground at The Diamond, the team made it to the final of the County Antrim Junior Shield, narrowly losing out to Lisburn Rangers. After several unsuccessful attempts to join the NAFL, they were finally admitted in 2001. The club made an instant impact winning Division 2C and the Cochrane and Corry Cup in their debut season. They won Division 2B the following season and in 2003–04 narrowly missed promotion to the Intermediate section by one point.

It took another three attempts to gain promotion to Division 1B. They also completed the 2006–07 season by winning the County Antrim Junior Shield. The team have continued their success in the Intermediate section having won promotion to Division 1A as runners-up in 2007–08 and ending their 2008–09 campaign in third place.

== Club honours ==
=== Junior honours ===
- County Antrim Junior Shield - 1 (once as Runners-up)

1998–99, 2006–07

- Cochrane and Corry Cup - 1 (once as Runners-up)

2001–02, 2002–03

- Irish Churches League Division 1 - 6

1991–92, 1992–93, 1993–94, 1994–95, 1995–96, 1999–00
