= Ardstraw F.C. =

Association football club in Northern Ireland

Ardstraw
- Full name: Ardstraw Football Club
- Nickname: The Bridge
- Founded: 1972
- Manager: Nigel Boyd
- League: Fermanagh & Western Football League

Ardstraw Football Club is an intermediate-level football club playing in the Fermanagh & Western Football League in Northern Ireland. The club is based in Ardstraw, County Tyrone. It is managed by Nigel Boyd and captained by former manager Lee "The Slab" Warnock, a tyrone constitution sports correspondent and Northern Ireland regions cup squad member.

The club participates in the Irish Cup.
