= Kilmore Recreation F.C. =

Association football club in Northern Ireland

Kilmore Rec.
- Full name: Kilmore Recreation Football Club
- Founded: 1967 (as Kilmore United)
- Ground: Robert Adams Park, Crossgar
- Capacity: 2,000
- Chairman: Noel Kielty
- Manager: Michael Carvill
- League: NAFL Premier Division
- 2024-25: NAFL Division 1A, 2nd
Home colours	Away colours

Kilmore Recreation Football Club, commonly known as Kilmore Rec., is a Northern Irish, intermediate football club with teams playing in Premier Division of the Northern Amateur Football League, Northern Ireland Women's Football League (NIWFL), South Belfast Youth League and Downpatrick Youth League. The club's home ground is Robert Adams Park, Crossgar, County Down.

The 1st Team is currently managed by former Linfield player Michael Carvill.

== History ==
=== Early Years (1967–1972) ===
It was following the 1966 World Cup in England, that two young local men, Bobby McClure and Dennis Lennon, decided to start a football team. After a few friendly games they called a meeting in April 1967 to form a club and as the majority of the players came from the village of Kilmore the name Kilmore United was chosen.

The first competitive games were in the Killyleagh summer league before entering the Newcastle & District League in 1968–69, playing at Hamiltons Field which was situated halfway between the villages of Kilmore and Annacloy.

During the first four years spent in the Newcastle & District League the club made it to the Harry Clarke Cup Final, losing to Annalong Rangers after a replay. It was at this time that Robert Adams, affectionately known as "Mr Kilmore", and his good friend Davy Harper became involved at the club.

=== Kilmore Rec. (1972–1990) ===
A name change to Kilmore Recreation and a change of ground to the monastery ground in Crossgar, where they still play today, preceded an application to join the Northern Ireland Amateur League in 1972. The first game in the Amateur League was at home to Carreras in Division 2B.

Two years later came promotion to Division 2A and the beginning of a successful six-year spell which would see Intermediate status achieved. Three successive Cochrane Corry Final appearances from season 1977–78 to season 1979–80 saw the trophy sit in the Kilmore clubrooms on two occasions. The middle year they lost 3–2 to Annalong Swifts but went on to defeat 40th Old Boys 2–1 in the County Antrim F.A. Junior Shield Final that was played at Castlereagh Park, Newtownards.

The momentum was kept going and in the season 1980–81 the Division 2A Championship was won and promotion to the First Division was confirmed. The club won the Division 1B Championship at the first attempt.

Status in the top Division, 1A, was maintained throughout the 1980s before suffering relegation in the season 1989–90. They bounced back the following year winning the Division 1B championship.

=== Kilmore Rec. (1990–present) ===
In 1991–92 the League created a Premier section and set a new level of ground criteria for clubs desiring to be part of it. Kilmore met all the requirements and became founder members.

The upgrade of the facilities enabled the club to host a senior Irish League club in round 5 of the Irish Challenge Cup for the first time. Cliftonville were the visitors and they defeated Kilmore 1–0 on 18 January 1992.

1994–95 saw a Kilmore Rec Under-18 team enter the Northern Ireland Youth Cup under the guidance of Billy Sloan. The team became one of few, and the last to date, Amateur league team to win the Cup. They defeated Portadown Boys 2–0 at Dixon Park, Ballyclare on 22 April 1996. The team defeated Irish League teams en route to winning the cup and players who competed in this team are now plying their trade in the Irish league and in the Amateur League.

The late 1990s brought another relegation (1996–97) and a promotion (1998–99). They are currently in the Premier Section. In 2001–02 the club were disqualified from the Border Regiment Cup after winning the semi-final tie against Dromara Village. However, the following season they made it back to the Border Cup Final, their first Intermediate status final. On this occasion Kilmore where defeated 2–0 by their local rivals, Killyleagh YC.

In 2003–04, following a disastrous start to the season with less than 10 points in the league at Christmas, the first team went on a winning spree after Christmas, winning all of their games and collecting the Clarence Cup en route with the highlight being the defeat of local rivals Downpatrick in the Clarence Cup Final, 5–1 after extra time, in a dramatic match at Dromara Village on 20 May 2004.

Off the field there have been significant changes, with a new perimeter wall, gates and a small grandstand all completed in the year 2000. New changing facilities were used on 28 September 2002 when Holywood visited in the 3rd round of the Border Regiment Cup. They were officially opened before a friendly match against Glentoran on 9 July 2003. They had just completed the signing of Kilmore player Andrew Waterworth, who had once scored seven goals in one match. The long-term plan is to provide a training pitch, car parking and floodlighting at Robert Adams Park.

The ground improvement plans were initiated in honour of Robert Adams, who died in May 1998 at the age of 47. For his work and dedication to the club the ground was renamed Robert Adams Park.

2004–05 saw Kilmore Rec first squad reach the semi-final of the County Antrim Shield under the management of Donal Bell. Kilmore saw off Irish Premier League opposition Ballymena United in the first round with a 1–0 win. Kilmore proceeded to the quarter-finals drawn against another Irish Premier League team, Lisburn Distillery. Kilmore beat the Irish League team 3–2 on penalties after a score of 1–1 after extra time. Kilmore were then drawn against yet another Irish League opponent, Linfield. Kilmore were beaten 2–0 ending their County Antrim Shield run.

Kilmore Rec were relegated from The Premier Division in May 2008 having only gained 26 points from 26 games. They were level on points with Nortel at the end of the season, Nortel however had a greater goal difference.

The 2008–09 season was one of mixed fortunes for Kilmore Rec. They managed to make it to the Border Cup Final for a third time, only to taste defeat for a third time, when Sport and Leisure ran out 3–1 winners. Gary Kennedy got the Kilmore goal with a blistering free kick. Kilmore's league form suffered due to their run in the Border Cup and subsequent loss. League leaders Abbey Villa had already gained significant progress and Kilmore were to play catchup for the remainder of the season. In a tightly fought race for second, Kilmore finished the season 4th, behind Ards Rangers and Sport and Leisure with only four points separating Kilmore and 2nd place Ards Rangers.

The 2009–10 season has been described as Kilmore's best and most successful. They were crowned champions of Division 1A and therefore gained promotion to the Premier League after a two-year absence. Kilmore also won the Steel and Sons Cup after beating local rivals Downpatrick FC 2–0 on Christmas Day 2009.

=== Steel and Sons Cup 2009 ===
During the 2009–10 season, Kilmore lifted the Steel and Sons Cup for the first time in the club's history. They began the competition in the 2nd round with an impressive 6–1 away victory over Premier League opponents Dunmurry Rec. Next up was a tricky away tie to Rosario YC. It was a tightly fought contest with the game finishing in a 1–1 draw after 90 minutes. However, Kilmore progressed after winning 4–3 on penalties. In the 4th round, Kilmore would come up against bitter rivals Killyleah YC. The two teams had not faced each other since Kilmore's relegation from the Premier League two years ago. Kilmore earned the bragging rights by winning the game 2–0 in a typically heated local derby and they progressed to the quarter-finals. The win set them up for a home tie against Rathern Rangers in which Kilmore won comfortably 5–0. In the most difficult tie of the competition so far, Kilmore came up against Intermediate League Champions Harland and Wolff Welders. In an exciting game, Kilmore sub Liam Graham scored a late equaliser after the Welders were leading the game 1–0. The game went to extra time and Graham again struck to put Kilmore into a shock 2–1 lead. However, the Welders soon equalised and the match went to penalties. Kilmore held their nerve and won the shootout 4–1 to put them into the Christmas Day final. To add extra spice, Kilmore were up against local rivals Downpatrick to make it an all-amateur final. The game was played at Crusaders FC home ground Seaview and, controversially, on an artificial 3G pitch. On a bitter cold Christmas morning Kilmore won the game 2–0 with goals from Niall McCarthy and Liam Graham. The success has been described as Kilmore's greatest ever achievement.

=== Current Management ===
The Kilmore Rec first team is currently under the management of Michael Carvill

=== Notable ex-players ===
- Gary Kennedy (Former Cliftonville striker) played for Kilmore at youth and senior level.
- Dan Gordon ( Down GAA Gaelic footballer) played for Kilmore at youth level.
- Andrew Waterworth (Linfield forward) played for Kilmore at youth and senior level.
- Michael Carvill (Linfield forward) played for Kilmore at youth level.
- Peter Kennedy (Former Northern Ireland professional footballer) played for Kilmore during the 2009/2010 season.
- Andy Kilmartin (Former Celtic & Lisburn Distillery midfielder) Signed for the club in 2011.

== Honours ==
=== Intermediate honours ===
- Steel & Sons Cup: 1
  - 2009–10
- Clarence Cup: 2
  - 2003–04, 2004–05

=== Junior honours ===
- County Antrim Junior Shield: 1
  - 1978–79
- Cochrane Corry Cup: 2
  - 1977–78, 1979–80
