= Banbridge Rangers F.C. =

Association football club in Northern Ireland

Banbridge Rangers
- Full name: Banbridge Rangers Football Club
- Nickname: BanGers
- Founded: 2005
- Ground: Cheney Park
- Chairman: John Clyde
- Manager: Jeffery Brady
- League: Mid-Ulster Football League Intermediate A
- 2018–19: Mid-Ulster Football League Intermediate A, Champions 19/20
Home colours

Banbridge Rangers Football Club, referred to as Banbridge Rangers, is an intermediate-level football club playing in the Intermediate A division of the Mid-Ulster Football League in Northern Ireland. The club is based in Banbridge and has two senior Men's teams and a youth set up incorporating boys and girls teams from Under 7s to Under 19s. They are a member of the Mid-Ulster Football Association.

The club started off in the Newcastle League in 2005–06, before joining the junior ranks of the Mid-Ulster League in 2006 and won Division 4 in the 2006–07 season. Intermediate status was achieved by the end of the 2008–09 season with a move to the new 3G facility at Cheney Park. In 2010/11 they won the Alan Wilson Cup, finished 3rd in Intermediate B and made the Quarter Finals of the Intermediate Cup. In 2011/12 they won Intermediate B and the Alan Wilson Cup. Banbridge Rangers have also won the Banbridge District Charity Cup in 2007, 2010, 2011, 2012.

Richard McMinn managed Banbridge Rangers from 30 December 2013 until 31 May 2016. Lee Feeney was then appointed Manager on 3 June 2016 and remained in charge until 16 July 2018. Banbridge Rangers finished as Runners-Up in the 2017/18 Season. Clifford Sterritt was appointed as Manager on 17 July 2018 and was then succeeded by Alastair Wilson on 27 December 2018. Banbridge Rangers won the 2018/19 MUFL Marshall Cup on Friday 24 May 2019 with a 2–0 win over Valley Rangers. The following season they won the Mid-Ulster Football League Intermediate A title 19/20.
