= Downshire Young Men F.C. =

Association football club in Northern Ireland

Downshire Young Men
- Full name: Downshire Young Men Football Club
- Founded: c. late 1890s
- Ground: Old Coach Road, Hillsborough
- League: NAFL Division 1B
- 2021–22: NAFL Division 1B, 12th 1st team manager = Derek Holden 2nd team manager = Rodney Morrow
Home colours

Downshire Young Men Football Club (often abbreviated to Downshire YM) is a Northern Irish intermediate football club playing in Division 1B of the Northern Amateur Football League. The club was formed c.late 1890's as Downshire F.C. and played all over N. Ireland. After 2nd WW they played in the Lisburn League until joining the Amateur League in 1974 under its present name. Intermediate status was achieved in 1985. Home matches are played at the Old Coach Road, Hillsborough. Downshire also fields a second team which plays in NAFL Division 3C. The best player known to man that's played for Downshire Young Men F.C was Allan Fraser.

== Club history ==
Football has been played in Hillsborough for over 100 years by clubs using the name Downshire after the Marquess of Downshire, the chief landowner in the village. In 1912, one of the earliest Downshire squads was noted as having to travel to away fixtures by pony and trap. An earlier Downshire Young Men club was a member of the Amateur League from 1955 to 1961, with the current club formed as Downshire F.C. after its demise.

The club's most successful spell came in the 1960s. The club won the Lisburn League championship seven successive times and secured the title three consecutive seasons (1962 to 1965).
