= Lower Maze F.C. =

Association football club in Northern Ireland

Lower Maze
- Full name: Lower Maze Football Club
- Nickname: The Mills
- Founded: 1960 (as Lisburn Mills)
- Ground: Lower Maze Social & Rec. Club, Bog Road
- Chairman: (Northern Ireland) Chris Carrol
- Manager: (Northern Ireland) Alan Parker
- League: Mid-Ulster Football League Intermediate B

Lower Maze Football Club is an intermediate-level football club playing in the Intermediate B division of the Mid-Ulster Football League in Northern Ireland. The club is based in Maze, County Down.

The club was formed as Lisburn Mills in 1960 and changed to its current name in 1994. The club is associated with the Mid-Ulster Football Association.

== Honours ==
- Alan Wilson Cup
  - 2023-24
