= 18th Newtownabbey Old Boys F.C. =

Association football club in Northern Ireland

18th Newtownabbey Old Boys
- Full name: 18th Newtownabbey Old Boys' Football Club
- Founded: 1969
- Ground: Cloyne Crescent, Newtownabbey
- League: NAFL Division 1A

18th Newtownabbey Old Boys' Football Club is a Northern Irish, intermediate football club playing in Division 1A of the Northern Amateur Football League. The club is based in Newtownabbey. The club plays in the Irish Cup.

  - Intermediate Honours**
  - NAFL Division 1C
  - 2017/18
  - Junior Honours**
  - NAFL Division 2C
  - 2002/03
  - Cochrane Corry Cup
  - 2005/06
