= Seagoe F.C. =

Association football club in Northern Ireland

Seagoe
- Full name: Seagoe Football Club
- Founded: 1979
- Ground: Tarsan Lane
- League: Mid-Ulster Football League Intermediate A

Seagoe Football Club is an intermediate-level football club playing in the Intermediate A division of the Mid-Ulster Football League in Northern Ireland. The club, which is part of the Mid-Ulster Football Association, is based in Portadown, County Armagh. The club regularly participates in the George Richardson Memorial Cup, alongside Portadown and other local clubs.

Larne striker Lee Bonis had a spell at the club prior to his 2019 move into senior football with Portadown.

== Honours ==
- Mid Ulster Intermediate B: 1
  - 2021-22
- Alan Wilson Cup: 1
  - 2018-19
