= 1997–98 Irish Cup =

Tournament details
- Country: Northern Ireland
- Teams: 88

Final positions
- Champions: Glentoran (17th win)
- Runners-up: Glenavon

Tournament statistics
- Matches played: 99
- Goals scored: 397 (4.01 per match)

The 1997–98 Irish Cup was the 118th edition of the Irish Cup, Northern Ireland's premier football knock-out cup competition. It concluded on 2 May 1998 with the final.

Glenavon were the defending champions after winning their 5th Irish Cup last season, with a 1–0 win over Cliftonville in the 1997 final. This season Glenavon reached the final again for the third year in a row, but were defeated 1–0 after extra time by Glentoran, who won the cup for the 17th time. This was a repeat of the 1995–96 final two years earlier that also ended 1–0 to the Glens.

== Results ==
=== First round ===
Team 1	Score	Team 2
Abbey Villa	3–1	Civil Service
AFC Craigavon	1–3	Annagh United
Ards Rangers	2–0	Donard Hospital
Ballycastle United	0–1	Islandmagee
Ballymacash Rangers	1–4	Northern Telecom
Ballynahinch United	1–5	1st Bangor Old Boys
Barn United	0–2	Rathfriland Rangers
Bessbrook United	1–3	Wellington Recreation
Bridge End United	2–4	Orangefield Old Boys
Cullybackey	2–4	Armoy United
Downshire Young Men	3–1	Portstewart
Dungiven Celtic	4–2	Saintfield United
Glebe Rangers	5–0	Laurelvale
Killyleagh Youth	0–0	Dromara Village
Malachians	5–1	UUC
Portglenone	1–0	Bangor Amateurs
Queen's University	4–4	Mountnorris
Roe Valley	3–2	Harland & Wolff Sport
Seapatrick	1–6	Albert Foundry
Shorts	0–0	Dromore Amateurs
Sirocco Works	0–5	Drummond United
Tandragee Rovers	5–5	East Belfast
UUJ	3–4	Comber Recreation
Warrenpoint Town	2–1	Larne Tech Old Boys

==== Replays ====
Team 1	Score	Team 2
Dromara Village	1–5	Killyleagh Youth
Dromore Amateurs	1–0	Shorts
East Belfast	9–0	Tandragee Rovers
Mountnorris	5–3	Queen's University

=== Second round ===
Team 1	Score	Team 2
Albert Foundry	2–0	Abbey Villa
Annagh United	2–1	Downshire Young Men
Ards Rangers	2–1	Mountnorris
Armoy United	0–2	Portglenone
Dromore Amateurs	3–1	East Belfast
Drummond United	1–3	Comber Recreation
Dungiven Celtic	2–0	Islandmagee
Killyleagh Youth	8–0	Wellington Recreation
Malachians	3–1	Glebe Rangers
Rathfriland Rangers	1–1	1st Bangor Old Boys
Roe Valley	3–0	Orangefield Old Boys
Warrenpoint Town	3–9	Northern Telecom

==== Replay ====
Team 1	Score	Team 2
1st Bangor Old Boys	1–1 (a.e.t.) (4–2 p)	Rathfriland Rangers

=== Third round ===
The following teams were given byes into the third round (A): Albert Foundry, Comber Recreation, Dromore Amateurs and Roe Valley.

Team 1	Score	Team 2
1st Bangor Old Boys	4–4	Portglenone
Annagh United	1–2	Northern Telecom
Ards Rangers	6–1	Dungiven Celtic
Killyleagh Youth	6–1	Malachians

==== Replay ====
Team 1	Score	Team 2
Portglenone	3–4	1st Bangor Old Boys

=== Third round (A) ===
Team 1	Score	Team 2
1st Bangor Old Boys	0–2	Ards Rangers
Albert Foundry	3–2	Comber Recreation
Dromore Amateurs	1–6	Killyleagh Youth
Northern Telecom	7–2	Roe Valley

=== Fourth round ===
Team 1	Score	Team 2
Ballymoney United	2–1	Kilmore Recreation
Banbridge Town	1–3	RUC
British Telecom	1–7	Armagh City
Chimney Corner	6–0	Coagh United
Crumlin United	3–0	Crewe United
Donegal Celtic	1–1	Killyleagh Youth
Drumaness Mills	0–0	Brantwood
Dundela	7–1	Moyola Park
Dunmurry Recreation	3–1	Cookstown United
FC Enkalon	1–2	Ballinamallard United
Institute	5–1	Northern Telecom
Tobermore United	6–0	Albert Foundry

==== Replays ====
Team 1	Score	Team 2
Brantwood	2–4	Drumaness Mills
Killyleagh Youth	2–0	Donegal Celtic

=== Fifth round ===
Team 1	Score	Team 2
Ards	0–2	Institute
Ballyclare Comrades	5–1	Ballymoney United
Ballymena United	1–1	Glentoran
Carrick Rangers	2–3	Armagh City
Cliftonville	0–2	Glenavon
Coleraine	3–1	Chimney Corner
Crusaders	1–0	Bangor
Distillery	2–0	RUC
Drumaness Mills	0–0	Killyleagh Youth
Dungannon Swifts	6–2	Ballinamallard United
Dunmurry Rec.	0–4	Ards Rangers
Larne	1–2	Portadown
Linfield	1–0	Tobermore United
Loughgall	4–0	Crumlin United
Newry Town	1–0	Dundela
Omagh Town	3–0	Limavady United

==== Replays ====
Team 1	Score	Team 2
Glentoran	2–1	Ballymena United
Killyleagh Youth	2–0	Drumaness Mills

=== Sixth round ===
Team 1	Score	Team 2
Armagh City	0–0	Ards Rangers
Crusaders	2–1	Killyleagh Youth
Dungannon Swifts	0–1	Institute
Glenavon	0–0	Ballyclare Comrades
Glentoran	3–2	Coleraine
Linfield	2–1	Newry Town
Loughgall	1–2	Distillery
Portadown	2–0	Omagh Town

==== Replays ====
Team 1	Score	Team 2
Armagh City	3–1	Ards Rangers
Ballyclare Comrades	0–4	Glenavon

=== Quarter-finals ===
Team 1	Score	Team 2
Armagh City	1–3	Glentoran
Crusaders	4–0	Institute
Linfield	3–0	Portadown
Distillery	0–2	Glenavon

=== Semi-finals ===
Team 1	Score	Team 2
Crusaders	1–3	Glenavon
Glentoran	2–1	Linfield

=== Final ===
2 May 1998

Glentoran	1 – 0 (a.e.t.)	Glenavon
Kennedy 97'	Report

Windsor Park, Belfast
