= 1989–90 Irish Cup =

Tournament details
- Country: Northern Ireland
- Teams: 83

Final positions
- Champions: Glentoran (15th win)
- Runners-up: Portadown

Tournament statistics
- Matches played: 97
- Goals scored: 309 (3.19 per match)

The 1989–90 Irish Cup was the 110th edition of the Irish Cup, Northern Ireland's premier football knock-out cup competition. It began on 20 January 1990 and concluded on 5 May 1990 with the final.

Ballymena United were the defending champions after winning their 6th Irish Cup last season, defeating Larne 1–0 in the 1989 final. However, this season they went out in the first round to Dungannon Swifts. Glentoran went on to win the cup for the fifth time in six seasons, and 15th time overall. They defeated Portadown 3–0 in the final.

== Results ==
=== First round ===
Team 1	Score	Team 2
1st Bangor Old Boys	2–0	Killymoon Rangers
Annagh United	1–5	Loughgall
Armagh City	6–3	Bangor Amateurs
Armoy United	0–3	Dundela
Ballyclare Comrades	3–0	Tandragee Rovers
Civil Service	3–2	UUC
Comber Rec.	0–1	RUC
Dromara Village	1–2	Downshire Young Men
Dromore Amateurs	0–2	Ballynahinch United
Drumaness Mills	1–0	Crewe United
FC Enkalon	1–1	GEC
Hanover	0–1	Crumlin United
Harland & Wolff Sports	4–0	Armagh Thistle
Islandmagee	3–2	Fisher Boy
Killyleagh Youth	3–1	Annalong Swifts
Kilmore Rec.	3–1	Ballymoney United
Larne Tech Old Boys	2–2	Newtownabbey Town
Orangefield Old Boys	1–1	Ards Rangers
Queen's University	1–0	1st Liverpool
Rathfriland Rangers	2–5	Institute
Roe Valley	3–1	Connor
Star of The Sea	1–8	Harland & Wolff Welders
UUJ	1–3	Cromac Albion

==== Replays ====
Team 1	Score	Team 2
Ards Rangers	5–1	Orangefield Old Boys
GEC	1–0	FC Enkalon
Newtownabbey Town	2–0	Larne Tech Old Boys

=== Second round ===
Team 1	Score	Team 2
1st Bangor Old Boys	2–0	Downshire Young Men
Ards Rangers	3–1	Ballynahinch United
Armagh City	3–3	Barn United
Blue Circle	0–7	Drumaness Mills
Civil Service	0–0	British Telecom
Cromac Albion	3–3	Roe Valley
Dundela	6–0	Newtownabbey Town
GEC	2–0	Queen's University
Harland & Wolff Welders	1–0	Portstewart
Institute	0–2	Crumlin United
Islandmagee	2–4	Harland & Wolff Sports
Killyleagh Youth	3–3	Ballyclare Comrades
Limavady United	1–0	Macosquin
Loughgall	2–1	Kilmore Rec.
Moyola Park	1–1	Shorts
Oxford United Stars	4–1	AFC
RUC	4–0	Saintfield United
STC	0–0	Sirocco Works

==== Replays ====
Team 1	Score	Team 2
Ballyclare Comrades	3–0	Killyleagh Youth
Barn United	2–2 (a.e.t.) (4–3 p)	Armagh City
British Telecom	4–0	Civil Service
Roe Valley	1–0	Cromac Albion
Shorts	4–1	Moyola Park
Sirocco Works	1–4	STC

=== Third round ===
With the exception of the below teams, all other winning teams from the second round were given a bye into the fourth round.

Team 1	Score	Team 2
Ards Rangers	1–2	Harland & Wolff Sports
Oxford United Stars	2–2	Dundela

==== Replays ====
Team 1	Score	Team 2
Dundela	4–3	Oxford United Stars

=== Fourth round ===
Team 1	Score	Team 2
Ballyclare Comrades	1–1	RUC
Barn United	4–1	Roe Valley
British Telecom	1–2	Loughgall
Crumlin United	1–3	Drumaness Mills
GEC	1–2	1st Bangor Old Boys
Harland & Wolff Welders	2–0	Limavady United
Shorts	0–1	Dundela
STC	2–1	Harland & Wolff Sports

==== Replay ====
Team 1	Score	Team 2
RUC	3–1	Ballyclare Comrades

=== Fifth round ===
Team 1	Score	Team 2
Ballymena United	1–1	Dungannon Swifts
Bangor	1–1	RUC
Brantwood	1–2	Banbridge Town
Carrick Rangers	2–0	Coagh United
Chimney Corner	1–0	Standard Telephones & Cables
Coleraine	2–0	Dunmurry Recreation
Cookstown United	0–5	Donegal Celtic
Crusaders	3–1	Drumaness Mills
Distillery	3–0	1st Bangor Old Boys
Glentoran	1–1	Cliftonville
Larne	1–0	Harland & Wolff Welders
Linfield	1–1	Glenavon
Loughgall	0–1	Barn United
Omagh Town	0–3	Ards
Portadown	1–0	Dundela
Tobermore United	0–2	Newry Town

==== Replays ====
Team 1	Score	Team 2
Cliftonville	0–1	Glentoran
Dungannon Swifts	1–1 (a.e.t.) (4–2 p)	Ballymena United
Glenavon	0–1	Linfield
RUC	0–3	Bangor

=== Sixth round ===
Team 1	Score	Team 2
Ards	0–2	Larne
Banbridge Town	2–1	Chimney Corner
Bangor	4–0	Distillery
Carrick Rangers	0–2	Portadown
Donegal Celtic	1–2	Linfield
Coleraine	2–0	Crusaders
Glentoran	2–1	Barn United
Newry Town	4–1	Dungannon Swifts

=== Quarter-finals ===
Team 1	Score	Team 2
Banbridge Town	0–1	Coleraine
Larne	1–2	Linfield
Newry Town	2–3	Glentoran
Portadown	2–1	Bangor

=== Semi-finals ===
Team 1	Score	Team 2
Glentoran	2–0	Linfield
Portadown	4–0	Coleraine

=== Final ===
5 May 1990

Glentoran	3 – 0	Portadown
Neill 60'; Douglas 85'; Morrison 87'	Report

Windsor Park, Belfast
