= 1988–89 Irish Cup =

Tournament details
- Country: Northern Ireland
- Teams: 76

Final positions
- Champions: Ballymena United (5th win)
- Runners-up: Larne

Tournament statistics
- Matches played: 81
- Goals scored: 263 (3.25 per match)

The 1988–89 Irish Cup was the 109th edition of the Irish Cup, Northern Ireland's premier football knock-out cup competition. It concluded on 6 May 1989 with the final.

Glentoran were the defending champions after winning their fourth consecutive Irish Cup the previous season by beating Glenavon 1–0 in the 1988 final. Their grip on the cup was finally broken by Linfield, who defeated them in the quarter-finals to inflict Glentoran's first Irish Cup defeat in 5 years. Ballymena United won the cup for the fifth time (sixth if you include Ballymena's record), defeating Larne 1–0 in the final. To date, this is Ballymena United's last cup success. In fact, they did not reach the final again until 2014.

The cup was expanded to 76 clubs this season, including more non-league clubs. There would now be five rounds, then the quarter-finals, semi-finals and the final.

== Results ==
=== First round ===
Annalong Swifts, Downshire Young Men, RUC, Queen's University and Blue Circle all received byes into the second round.

Team 1	Score	Team 2
Armagh City	0–1	Orangefield Old Boys
Armoy United	3–1	Dromara Village
Ballynahinch United	2–2 (2–3 p)	Civil Service
Bangor Amateurs	3–1	Larne Tech Old Boys
Barn United	0–2	Park
Comber Recreation	0–4	Harland & Wolff Sports
Crewe United	6–1	Cullybackey
Cromac Albion	2–0	Annagh United
Dundela	6–2	Ballymoney United
GEC	2–1	Loughgall
Harland & Wolff Welders	3–0	UUC
Institute	0–1	Ards Rangers
Islandmagee	2–1	Kilmore Recreation
Killyleagh Youth	6–1	Armagh Town
Limavady United	2–1	Standard Telephones & Cables
Macosquin	4–0	Saintfield United
Moyola Park	4–0	Oxford United
Portstewart	0–1	1st Bangor Old Boys
POSC	2–1	A.F.C. Craigavon
Rathfriland Rangers	2–2 (6–3 p)	Newtownabbey Town
Shorts	2–1	Sirocco Works
Star of the Sea	5–1	UUJ
Tandragee Rovers	2–5	Roe Valley

=== Second round ===
Team 1	Score	Team 2
Annalong Swifts	1–2	Limavady United
Bangor Amateurs	1–0	Orangefield Old Boys
Cromac Albion	2–1	Shorts
Downshire Young Men	1–2	Rathfriland Rangers
Dundela	4–3	Killyleagh Youth
GEC	2–4	Ards Rangers
Harland & Wolff Welders	5–0	Crewe United
Islandmagee	2–1	POSC
Macosquin	0–1	Armoy United
Moyola Park	1–2	Harland & Wolff Sports
Park	3–0	1st Bangor Old Boys
Queen's University	3–0	Civil Service
Roe Valley	5–1	Blue Circle
RUC	2–2 (6–5 p)	Star of the Sea

=== Third round ===
Team 1	Score	Team 2
Armoy United	3–1	Rathfriland Rangers
Cromac Albion Youth	2–1	Bangor Amateurs
Dundela	6–0	Islandmagee
Harland & Wolff Welders	1–0	Queen's University
Limavady United	2–1	Ards Rangers
Park	0–0 (4–3 p)	Harland & Wolff Sports
Roe Valley	3–1	RUC

=== Fourth round ===
The 14 top flight clubs entered in this round, along with the seven third round winners, and 11 non-league clubs given byes to this round.

Team 1	Score	Team 2
Ards	0–1	Cromac Albion
Banbridge Town	3–0	Roe Valley
Carrick Rangers	1–0	Bangor
Cookstown United	1–4	Ballyclare Comrades
Coleraine	1-3	Linfield
Crusaders	2–0	Dungannon Swifts
Distillery	1–4	Ballymena United
Dunmurry Rec.	0–1	Donegal Celtic
Larne	3–0	Chimney Corner
Portadown	1–0	Coagh United
Glenavon	4–2	Dundela
Glentoran	5–1	Armoy United
Newry Town	1–2	Cliftonville
Omagh Town	2–0	Brantwood
Park	2–0	Harland & Wolff Welders
Tobermore United	3–0	Limavady United

=== Fifth round ===
Team 1	Score	Team 2
Ballyclare Comrades	2–2	Ballymena United
Carrick Rangers	2–1	Portadown
Cliftonville	1–0	Park
Crusaders	1–0	Banbridge Town
Larne	6–1	Donegal Celtic
Glenavon	0–3	Linfield
Omagh Town	2–3	Glentoran
Tobermore United	1–1	Cromac Albion

==== Replays ====
Team 1	Score	Team 2
Ballymena United	5–1	Ballyclare Comrades
Cromac Albion	0–1	Tobermore United

=== Quarter-finals ===
Team 1	Score	Team 2
Cliftonville	0–0	Tobermore United
Crusaders	2–3	Ballymena United
Larne	0–0	Carrick Rangers
Glentoran	0–3	Linfield

==== Replays ====
Team 1	Score	Team 2
Carrick Rangers	2–3	Larne
Tobermore United	0–1	Cliftonville

=== Semi-finals ===
Team 1	Score	Team 2
Cliftonville	1–1	Larne
Linfield	1–1	Ballymena United

==== Replays ====
Team 1	Score	Team 2
Ballymena United	2–1	Linfield
Larne	2–1	Cliftonville

=== Final ===
6 May 1989

Ballymena United	1 – 0	Larne
Hardy 73'	Report

The Oval, Belfast
