= Old boy =

Old boy or Oldboy or Old Boys may refer to:

- Old Boys, male former pupils of schools in Britain, some schools in Australia, Canada, India, New Zealand, Trinidad and Tobago
  - Old boy network, social and business connections among former pupils of top male-only schools
  - A cadet who has attended St. John's Military School

== Film ==
- Oldboy (2003 film), South Korean film based on the manga, directed by Park Chan-wook
- Oldboy (2013 film), American remake of the 2003 South Korean film, directed by Spike Lee
- Old Boys (2010 film), Chinese short comedy film
- Old Boys: The Way of the Dragon, 2014 Chinese film
- Old Boys (2018 film), British film directed by Toby MacDonald

== People ==
- Old Boy, pseudonym of Australian sports journalist Reginald Wilmot (1869–1949)

== Sports teams and clubs ==
- 1st Bangor Old Boys F.C., Bangor, Northern Ireland
- 18th Newtownabbey Old Boys, Newtownabbey, Northern Ireland
- 22nd Old Boys F.C., Belfast, Northern Ireland
- BSC Old Boys, Basel, Switzerland
- Ballynure Old Boys F.C., Ballynure, Northern Ireland
- Kelvin Old Boys F.C., Belfast, Northern Ireland
- Larne Technical Old Boys F.C., Larne, Northern Ireland
- Newell's Old Boys, Argentine football club
- Old Boys' AFC, semi-professional football team based in Invercargill, New Zealand
- Old Boys & Old Girls Club, Montevideo, Uruguay
- Orangefield Old Boys F.C., Belfast, Northern Ireland

== Other uses ==
- Old Boy (manga), manga series
- Old Boy (TV series), Chinese television series
