= Crumlin Star F.C. =

Association football club in Northern Ireland

Crumlin Star
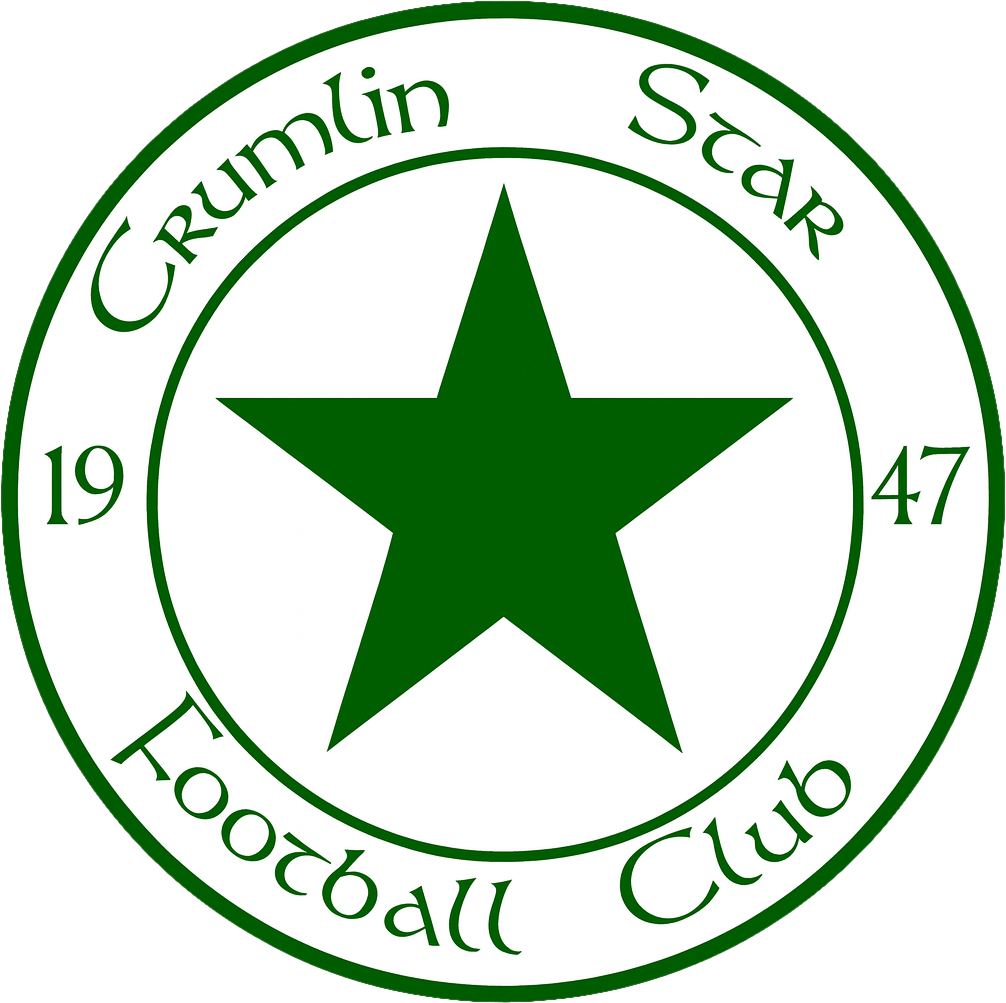
- Full name: Crumlin Star Football Club
- Nickname: Star
- Founded: 1947
- Ground: Marrowbone Park
- League: NAFL Premier Division
- 2024–25: NAFL Premier Division, 3rd
Home colours

Crumlin Star Football Club is an intermediate, Northern Irish association football club based in Belfast, and playing in the Premier Division of the Northern Amateur Football League. The club plays in black.

== History ==
The club, based at the Crumlin Star social club in Ardoyne beside the Crumlin Road, was established in 1947. From 2010 to 2013 they were tenants at Solitude, home of Cliftonville. They subsequently moved to the Cliff in Larne as the NAFL require Premiership clubs to have "total control of their ground" in the event of ground-sharing.

They play in the Northern Amateur Football League (NAFL), and were generally based in the league's lower divisions in the twentieth century. Their honours included divisional titles for 2B in 1990–91 and 2C in 1999–00. The club won their second 2B title in 2003–04 and the following season won the 2A title. They won this title again in 2008–09 and 2009–10 at which point they were promoted to Division 1C, the first level of the NAFL to be recognised as intermediate rather than junior. The club then won Division 1C in 2010–11 and the following season also added the 1B title to gain a first promotion to Division 1A, the second tier of the NAFL. During this spell their main goal threat came from Joe Gormley, who scored 61 goals for the club during the 2010–11 season. The club also made the final of the Border Cup in 2011–12, where they defeated higher division opposition in Islandmagee. Star would complete a back to back double the following year when they won the same competition defeating Rathfriland Rangers 2–1, Bricky and Mooney with the goals. Later that same season (2012–13) Star won the NAFL Division 1A title to secure promotion to the Premier Division, the highest tier of the NAFL. They then secured a treble success by adding the Clarence Cup.

The club qualified for the Irish Cup for the first time in 2011–12, reaching the third round by overcoming Lisburn Rangers and Abbey Villa before losing to Immaculata. They made the fourth round the following year, losing to Bangor, having earlier defeated Bryansburn Rangers in the first round 1–0, along with Barn United in the second and Newcastle in the third.

Crumlin Star won the 2016–17 NAFL Premier Division title, finishing six points clear of second-placed Downpatrick.

== Attack ==
In 2011 the club, which is identified with the nationalist-republican community, were the subject of a sectarian attack on the Twelfth. After returning from an outing to Dundalk Stadium, members of the team were attacked at Alliance Avenue (a street marking the border between republican Ardoyne and loyalist Upper Ardoyne) by a crowd of 30–40 people armed with cudgels and bottles. Eight of the team suffered injuries with Ciaran Reid sustaining a broken leg and foot and Anthony Braniff requiring stitches to an injury above his eye.

== Honours ==
=== Intermediate honours ===
- Irish Intermediate Cup: 4
  - 2018–19, 2022–23, 2024-25, 2025-26
- Northern Amateur Football League Premier Division: 3
  - 2016–17, 2017–18, 2018–19
- Clarence Cup: 3
  - 2012–13, 2017–18, 2024-25
- Border Cup: 5
  - 2011–12, 2012–13, 2017–18, 2018–19, 2022–23
- Northern Amateur Football League 1A: 1
  - 2012-13
- Northern Amateur Football League 1B: 1
  - 2011-12
- Northern Amateur Football League 1C: 1
  - 2010-11

=== Junior honours ===
- Northern Amateur Football League 2A: 3
  - 2004-05, 2008–09, 2009–10
- Northern Amateur Football League 2B: 2
  - 1990-91, 2003–04
- Northern Amateur Football League 2C: 1
  - 1999-00
- Irish Junior Cup: 1
  - 1951–52
- County Antrim Junior Shield: 1
  - 2009–10
  - NAFL Walter Moore cup 2013-14
