= Annalong F.C. =

Football club in County Down, Northern Ireland

Annalong
- Full name: Annalong Football Club
- Nicknames: The Long, Annalong Rangers
- Founded: 1895 as Annalong Rangers
- Ground: Hillmount Park
- Manager: Frank Hyland
- League: Mid-Ulster Football League

Annalong Football Club, frequently referred to as Annalong F.C. or by their nickname "The Long," is an intermediate-level football club competing in Division 1 of the Mid-Ulster Football League in Northern Ireland. The club is based in Annalong, Kilkeel, County Down, and have two senior men's teams. They also have a youth academy for boys and girls. Annalong are one of the oldest football clubs in South Down, having being formed in 1895 as Annalong Rangers. In the 1970s until the 2010s they were known as Annalong Swifts before changing again to simply Annalong but still referred to as Annalong Rangers.

The club is a member of the Mid-Ulster Football Association and is eligible to compete in the IFA Junior Cup and the national cup competition, the Irish Cup. They also participate in regional cups such as the Marshall Cup and the Beckett Cup.

== History ==
Annalong F.C. were founded in 1895. Their first match was on the 8th of October against Newcastle F.C, losing 2-1.

Annalong were successful in the Newcastle & District League before joining the more competitive Mid-Ulster Football League. They joined the latter in 2018.

In 1959, Annalong won the IFA Junior Cup for the first time in their history, beating St. Patricks YM 3-1.

In the 1988–89 Irish Cup, Annalong reached round 2, but were beaten 2-1 against Limavady United.

The 1989–90 Irish Cup saw Annalong reached the first round proper again, but were beaten 3-1 by Killyleagh Youth.

In the 1991–92 Irish Cup, Annalong drew 3-3 with Ballynahinch United, resulting in a replay. They beat Ballynahinch, and in round 2, Nortel F.C. beat Annalong 3-1.

The 1992–93 Irish Cup saw Annalong Swifts draw with Connor F.C. 4-4 at home. In the replay, the Swifts lost 2-1 away. This season seen Annalong reach the first round for the 4th season in a row.

In the 1993–94 Irish Cup, Annalong reached the first round for the 5th season in a row. They were drawn against Islandmagee, who beat them 5-1.

In 2019, Annalong finished the season winning the double, having won the Beckett Cup and then crowned champions of Division 3.

== Club identity and ground ==
The club's home colours are blue, and their away kit is black. The Annalong F.C. crest depicts a fishing boat, which represents the village's long history with being a coastal fishing village. In the background on the crest, shows the Mourne Mountains.

Annalong play their home games at Hillmount Park on the Kilkeel Road. In 2025, they installed security cameras following the ground being vandalized.

== Honours ==
Irish Football Association

- IFA Junior Cup
  - 1958/59, Runners-up: 1978/79
- Cochrane Corry Cup
  - 1978/79

Mid-Ulster Football League

- Division 2
  - Runners-up: 2019/20
- Division 3
  - 2018/19
- Beckett Cup
  - 2018/19

Newcastle & District League

- First Division
  - Multiple - 1950s and 1960s
- Harry Clarke Cup
  - 1960s
