= Bangor Young Men F.C. =

Bangor Young Men
- Full name: Bangor Young Men Football Club
- Founded: 1941
- Ground: Bloomfield Playing Fields
- League: Northern Amateur Football League Down Area Winter Football League (reserves)

Bangor Young Men Football Club, referred to as Bangor Young Men, are a Northern Irish football club based in Bangor, County Down. Bangor Young Men were founded in 1941, and they play in the Northern Amateur Football League. Bangor Young Men II's play in the NAFL Reserves League. The III's play in the Down Area Winter Football League. Bangor Young Men are a part of the County Antrim & District FA. The club play in the Irish Cup.

Bangor YM play their games at Bloomfield Playing Fields. They play in black and white candy stripes.

== History ==
In 1941, Bangor Young Men was founded, becoming the first junior side in Bangor. They came into existence when members of the First Bangor Young Men social organization broke away to establish the Bangor Young Men Social Club, which then created a football team.

The club's first chairman was Syd Maguire, a Bangor sports writer. The other founding members of the 1940 team included David Geary, Jackie Burns, and Eddie Barry. Barry later became a successful administrator, holding positions as secretary of the Churches League, director of Bangor F.C., and a representative for both the Irish Football Association and UEFA.

Bangor Young Men would play in the Churches League up until 1981, when they were accepted into the Northern Amateur Football League for the 1981/82 season.

In 2020, the club was named North East Region Club of the year by the Irish Football Association. Coach Lee Scott won Volunteer of the Year and the North East Wes Gregg Coach of the Year award in 2021 and 2022 respectively.

== Honours ==
- Northern Amateur Football League
  - Amateur League 3D Champions
    - 1991/92
  - NAFL Cochrane Corry Cup Winners
    - 2021/22
- Irish Football Association
  - Grassroots North East Region Club of the Year award
    - 2020
  - Grassroots North East Wes Gregg Coach of the Year award
    - 2022 (Lee Scott)
  - Volunteer of the Year
    - 2021 (Lee Scott for Bangor Young Men Academy)
  - County Antrim & District FA
    - County Antrim Junior Shield
      - 1973/74
  - Churches League
    - Division A
      - 1973/74
    - Diamond Cup
      - 1975/76
    - Scarlett Cup
      - 1953/54
    - Beckett Cup
      - 1972/73, 1975/76, 1978/79, 1979/80
    - McCracken Cup
      - 1975/76
  - Down Area Winter Football League
    - Down Area League Winners
    - Youth Team Challenge Cup
    - Frank Moore Memorial Cup
      - 2023/24
