= Bryansburn Rangers F.C. =

Association football club in Northern Ireland

Bryansburn Rangers
- Full name: Bryansburn Rangers Football Club
- Nickname: The Burn
- Founded: 1974
- Ground: Ballywooley Park, Bangor
- Chairman: (Northern Ireland) Alan Dempster
- Manager: (Northern Ireland) Andy Wallace
- League: NAFL Division 1B
- 2025-26: NAFL Division 1B, 11th
- Website: bryansburnrangersfc.com
Home colours	Away colours

Bryansburn Rangers Football Club is a Northern Irish intermediate football club playing in Division 1B of the Northern Amateur Football League. Founded in 1974, the club originates from the Bryansburn Area of Bangor, County Down and play their home matches at Ballywooley Park on the Crawfordsburn Road. The club competes in a number of cup competitions in Northern Ireland, such as the Steel & Sons Cup, the Irish Cup, the Irish Intermediate Cup, the Clarence Cup and the Border Cup.

== History ==
Founded in 1974, the club joined the Amateur League in 1984 and have played their ever since.

As of the 21st century Bryansburn fields four senior teams in total, along with a youth academy. Both the first team, and second team play in Northern Amateur Football League Division 1B, and 3D, along with a 3rd team that compete in the Down Area League, Division 2. The first team were promoted to Division 1A at the end of 2009–10 season, however 2 back-to-back relegation's left the team in 1C. After a number of years in 1C, the 1st team gained promotion once again to 1B in the 17/18 season, finishing runners up to 18th Newtownabbey Old Boys F.C. They have been in 1B ever since, recording a best finish of 3rd in the 2018/19 season, losing out on promotion to Grove United F.C. and Dromara Village F.C.

In January 2010, the club reached the fifth round of the Irish Cup. Hoping for a draw against one of the bigger Irish league clubs, they drew fellow Amateur league side Nortel F.C. who at the time were in the Premier Division of the Northern Amateur Football League. The game finished 2-2 on the night, with Nortel winning 5-4 on penalties and booking their place in the round of 16.

As of 2026, the first team is managed by Andy Wallace, the former Sirocco Works F.C. and Glentoran W.F.C. boss took over from former player Andy Thompson, in May 2026, after Thompson and his team spent 3 seasons in charge.

== Ground ==
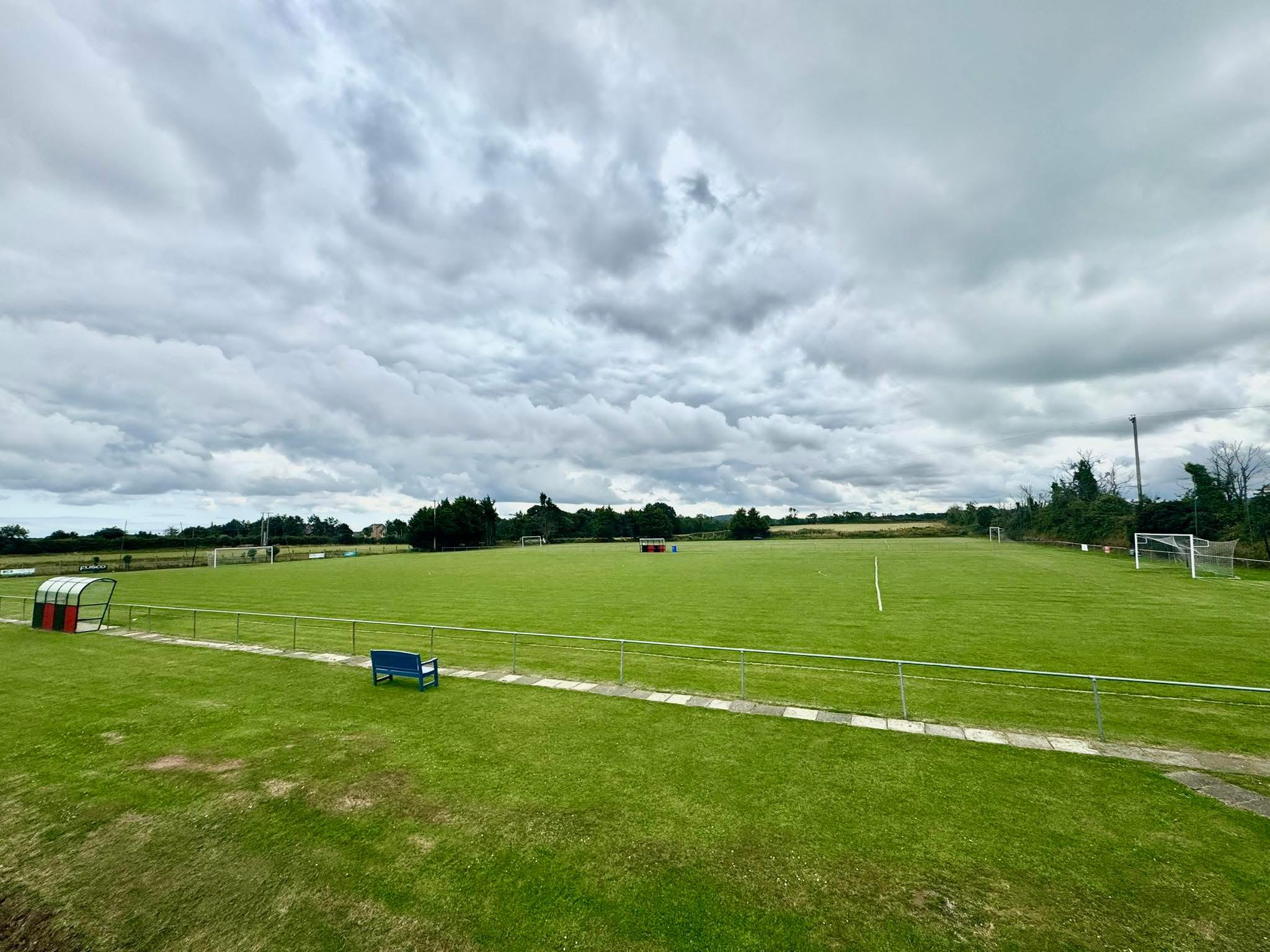
Ballywooley, home ground of Bryansburn Rangers, 2024.

The club, which was founded in 1974, began playing their games at Connor Park at Stricklands Glen in the west of the town, before moving to their current home ground only a few kilometers away at Ballywooley Park on the Crawfordsburn Road.

On 29 March 2015, in the lead up to the UEFA Euro 2016 qualifier between Northern Ireland national football team and Finland national football team, Bryansburns home ground 'Ballywooley' was used as a venue for the fans' game between the Northern Ireland and Finland fans teams. Former Northern Ireland international Keith Gillespie who made a guest appearance for the Northern Ireland fans team, along with Finnish player Jari Litmanen for the Finland fans team. Northern Ireland were 3–1 winners.

== Honours ==
=== Intermediate honours ===
- Northern Amateur Football League 1B
  - 2009/10 (Runners up)
- Northern Amateur Football League 1C
  - 2017/18 (Runners up)

=== Junior honours ===
- Northern Amateur Football League 2C: 2
  - 1996/97
  - 2000/01

=== Down Area Winter Football League ===
- Mervyn Bassett Cup
- 2014
- Champions of Down
- 2016, 2026

== Notable former players ==
- Josh Magennis, international footballer who has played with the Northern Ireland national team and EFL League One side Stevenage F.C.
