= Greenwell Star F.C. =

Greenwell Star
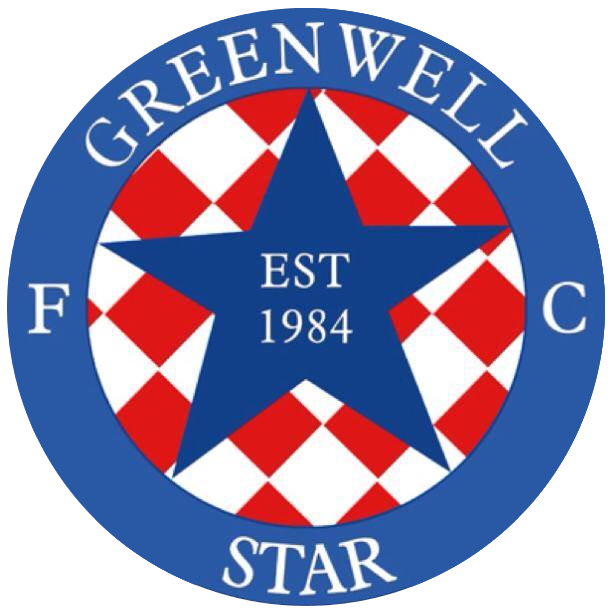
- Full name: Greenwell Star Football Club
- Founded: 1984
- Ground: West Winds Council Pitch
- League: Northern Amateur Football League

Greenwell Star Football Club, referred to as Greenwell Star, are a Northern Irish football club based in Newtownards, County Down. Greenwell Star were founded in 1984, and they play in the Northern Amateur Football League. Greenwell Star II's play in the NAFL Reserves League. The youth teams play in the South Belfast Youth Football League. Greenwell are a part of the County Antrim & District FA. The club play in the Irish Cup.

Greenwell Star play their home games at West Winds Council Pitch. Their home colours are royal blue. They were accepted into the Northern Amateur Football League for the 2023/24 season following a long period of success. Prior to this, Greenwell Star played in the Down Area Winter Football League. They won the DAWFL Premier Division in three consecutive seasons, from 2019 to 2023.

== Honours ==
- Down Area Winter Football League
  - Premier Division
    - 1997/98, 1999/00, 2006/07, 2012/13, 2015/16, 2018/19, 2021/22, 2022/23
  - Reserve Division 1
    - 2006/07, 2009/10, 2015/16, 2018/19
  - Billy Allen Memorial Shield
    - 1998/99, 2006/07 ,2013/14, 2014/15, 2015/16, 2018/19, 2022/23
  - Sittlington Cup
    - 2002/03, 2006/07, 2010/11, 2014/15, 2018/19, 2021/22
  - Tommy Murphy Memorial Shield
    - 2006/07, 2021/22
  - Mervyn Bassett Cup
    - 2006/07, 2015/16, 2018/19
  - Frank Moore Memorial Cup
    - 2008/09, 2009/10
  - Dennis S. Nash Charity Shield
    - 2013, 2014, 2015, 2016, 2023
