= Bloomfield F.C. =

Association football club in Northern Ireland

Bloomfield
- Full name: Bloomfield Football Club
- Nickname: Purple Army
- Founded: c. 1922 (as 24th Old Boys)
- Ground: The Houston Park Velodrome Belfast
- Chairman: Big Roon
- Manager: Marc Roy
- League: NAFL Division 1C
- 2017–18: NAFL Division 1C, 9th
Home colours

Bloomfield Football Club (previously known as 24th Old Boys), referred to simply as Bloomfield, is a Northern Irish intermediate football club playing in Division 1C of the Northern Amateur Football League. They are nicknamed the Purple Army. They are based in Ballyhackamore, Bloomfield, east Belfast.

The club formed in the 1922 as the 24th O.B., composed of former members of the 24th Belfast Boys' Brigade company. In 1990, they changed their name to Bloomfield upon joining the Amateur League (having spent some 30 years in the BB Old Boys' Union League.

== History ==
The club was formed in 1922 as 24th Old Boys Football Club and played in the Boys' Brigade Old Boys League. They would meet in Bloomfield Presbyterian Church, Ballyhackamore, a tradition that the 24th Boys Brigade still do every on a weekly basis.

In the Old Boys League, they won Multiple Division 1 League Titles, the Old Boys Shield and the 14th Old Boys Cup.

In the 1990, the club joined the Northern Amateur Football League, and changed their name to Bloomfield. The name represents the location of the Old Boy's being based in the area of Bloomfield in east Belfast. This came following the diminishing Old Boys' League that ceased to exist in the 2000s.

Bloomfield's biggest cup victory came in 1997, when they won the Cochrane Corry Cup. They beat Lisburn Rangers F.C. 1-0 in the final. Bloomfield finished the season winning the double, as they won Division 2B.

In 2002, Bloomfield reached the Cochrane Corry Cup for the second time in their history. This time they were beat 3-2 by Rathfern Rangers.

In 2012, Bloomfield finished runners-up in Division 1C.

In 2024, Bloomfield Ladies coach Torrie Laverty won the Belfast City Council Sports Awards Young Coach of the Year award.

In May 2025, Bloomfield Ladies youth team beat Linfield F.C. Ladies 2-0 in the NIYFA Cup final.

In November 2025, junior team coach Blaine McMillian was recognised at the Eastside Awards, being nominated for the Local Sporting Hero award and being one of the finalists.

== Club identity, structure and ground ==
They play their home matches at the Orangefield playing fields complex at Houston Park, Belfast. Their home colours are purple.

The first team manager is Marc Roy an experienced and high decorated amateur league footballer. As well as the first team, there is a second team playing in the NAFL Division 3B and a third team in the premier league of the South Antrim Football League. Bloomfield have a team fielded in the Down Area Winter Football League. There is also an over 35's team.

The women's team, Bloomfield Ladies, play in the NIWFA League.

== Academy and youth teams ==
There are also 6 youth teams ranging from Under 16's down to Under 5's that compete in the South Belfast South League.

In 2024, Larne FC announced that they would be working with Bloomfield to produce an academy partnership scheme scheme. Bloomfield FC have one of Northern Ireland's largest academy set-ups with over 500 boys and girls playing weekly, and having 42 junior teams. The previous year Linfield FC created a similar partnership with Bloomfield.

== Honours ==
Northern Amateur Football League

- Division 2B
  - 1996/7, 2001/02
- Cochrane Corry Cup:
  - 1996/97, runners-up: 2001/02
- Division 2A
  - Runners-up: 2002/03, 2004/05
- Division 1C
  - runners-up: 2011/12

Reserves honours

- Division 3B
  - 2006/7
- Division 3 C
  - Runners-up 2004-05

Awards

Belfast City Council

- Belfast Sports Awards - Young Coach of the Year
  - 2024 - Torrie Laverty - Bloomfield Ladies

Eastside Awards

- Local Sporting Hero award
  - 2025 - Blaine McMillian - Junior Team
