= Belvoir F.C. =

Belvoir
- Full name: Belvoir Football Club
- Nickname: Amber Army
- Founded: 1957
- Capacity: Hydebank playing fields
- Chairman: Barry Magee
- League: Northern Amateur Football League

Belvoir Football Club, referred to simply as Belvoir, is a Northern Irish, intermediate football club playing in the Northern Amateur Football League. The club is based in Belvoir Estate, South Belfast, and was formed in 1957. They are a part of the County Antrim & District FA. The club plays in the Irish Cup.

== History ==
Belvoir F.C., founded in 1957, started out playing in local youth and regional leagues and then went on to join the Down Area Winter Football League. Belvoir F.C. were admitted into the Northern Amateur Football League for the 2023/24 season, reaching intermediate status, and allowing them to play in the national cup.

== Ground ==
Belvoir play their home games at Hydebank playing fields, and train at Belvoir Pitches. They play in orange and black.

In 2022, Linfield F.C., in partnership with the Boys' Brigade and Belvoir F.C., submitted plans for a new training facility at Belvoir. The first phase of the project includes a new grass pitch for Belvoir F.C., a full-size 3G pitch for Linfield and community use, and a floodlit grass pitch with the same dimensions as Windsor Park. The project secured an initial £250,000 in funding from Belfast City Council. Politician Jeffrey Dudgeon has approved of the initial cash injection for the first phase of a new multi-million pound community sports facility in the area.

== Honours ==
- Down Area Winter Football League
  - Division 1
    - 2018/19
  - Fair Play Awards
    - 2017/2018 (shared)
