= Antrim Rovers F.C. =

Football club in Northern Ireland

Antrim Rovers
- Full name: Antrim Rovers Football Club
- Nickname: The Rovers
- Founded: 1998
- Chairman: Alan Stewart
- League: Northern Amateur Football League
- Website: antrimroversfc.com

Antrim Rovers Football Club, or referred to Antrim Rovers, or The Rovers, are a Northern Irish football club based in the town of Antrim, County Antrim. Antrim Rovers F.C. were founded in 1998, and they play in the Northern Amateur Football League. Antrim Rovers are a part of the County Antrim & District FA. The Rovers play in the Irish Cup.

Antrim Rovers are the biggest sports club in the Antrim and Newtownabbey Borough, with 22 squads from youth to senior level, and over 500 members. The senior team were accepted into the NAFL for the 2023/24 season. The Rovers Reserves play in the NAFL Reserves League. The Antrim Rovers Ladies play in the NIWFA. Youth teams compete in the South Belfast Youth Football League. The junior teams compete in the IFA Game Development Programme.

== Ground, colours and crest ==
The Rovers play their home games at Allen Park. Their home colours are red and black. The Rovers refers to when they didn't have a fixed home ground. The team would train and play on any pitch that was available.

The club's crest features Antrim's Round Tower, a historic landmark in Antrim. It also features Lady Marian’s legendary wolfhound, a heroic figure from local folklore. According to legend, a noble hound saved Lady Marian Langford from a wolf attack near Lough Neagh before mysteriously disappearing. The hound's legend lived on in a stone carving that is said to appear atop Antrim Castle's highest turret during times of peril. Together, these symbols celebrate the club's skill, speed, strength, bravery, and enduring spirit—ideals that reflect Antrim Rovers' values both on and off the pitch.
