= LSFC =

LSFC may refer to:

In education:

- Leyton Sixth Form College
- Lowestoft Sixth Form College
- Luton Sixth Form College

In sport:

- Lancashire Steel F.C.
- Lambourn Sports F.C.
- Leinster Senior Football Championship, a Gaelic football competition in Ireland
- London Scottish F.C.
- Lower Shankill F.C.
