= Ford F.C. =

Ford
- Full name: Ford Football Club
- Founded: 1970
- Ground: Wedderburn Park
- League: Northern Amateur Football League

Ford Football Club, or referred to simply as Ford, are a Northern Irish football club based in West Belfast, Northern Ireland. Ford F.C. were founded in 1970, and they play in the Northern Amateur Football League. They were originally founded as a works team for factory workers of Ford Motors, similarly to Ford Motors F.C. in England. Ford are a part of the County Antrim & District FA. The club play in the Irish Cup.

Ford, as well as Ford II's play their home games at Wedderburn Park. Their home colours are yellow and blue.

In September 2023, Ford held a tournament fundraiser for West Belfast suicide prevention charity West Wellbeing. They received donations from Power NI.

== Honours ==
- Northern Amateur Football League
  - NAFL Division 2A
    - 2003/4, 2005/6
  - NAFL Cochrane Corry Cup
    - 2006/7
- Ford II's
- Division 3C
  - 2001/2
- Division 3D
  - 1999/0
- Division 3E
  - 1996/7
- Templeton Cup
  - 2001/2
