= Whitehead Eagles F.C. =

Whitehead Eagles
- Full name: Whitehead Eagles Football Club
- Nickname: The Eagles
- Founded: 1976
- Ground: Castleview Road Playing Fields
- Chairman: Nigel Tilson
- League: Northern Amateur Football League

Whitehead Eagles Football Club, referred to as Whitehead Eagles or simply "The Eagles" are a Northern Irish football club based in Whitehead, County Antrim. Whitehead Eagles F.C. were founded in 1976, and they play in the Northern Amateur Football League. The Whitehead II's play in the NAFL Reserves League. Whitehead Eagles are a part of the County Antrim & District FA. The Eagles play in the Irish Cup.

The Eagles play at Castleview Road Playing Fields, and their home colours royal blue and black.

== History ==
Whitehead Eagles was formed in 1976, the local football team for the seaside town of Whitehead. The Eagles started playing league games in the Larne District league in the 1970's and 80's, winning the Larne Mineral Water Cup in 1980 as a second division club beating treble chasing Parkview Swifts 2-1 in the final.They then moved to the Dunmurray & District League, winning the Cyril Lord]Shield in their first season, defeating Belfast United 3-1 in the final at Castlereagh Park with goals from Paul ODonnell, Stephen McWillian and Timmy McMurtrie .

In 2017, Whitehead Eagles Junior Academy hosted the inaugural Whitehead Summer Festival Football Tournament. Teams that took part included Linfield, Glentoran and Cliftonville. The tournament is still active annually.

In 2024, Larne F.C. launched a partnership with Whitehead Eagles youth team to improve development of the junior team.

== Honours ==
- Northern Amateur Football League
  - Division 2C Champions
    - 2003/4
- Larne & District League
  - Larne Mineral Water Cup
    - 1980
- Dunmurray & District League
  - Cyril Lord Shield
    - 1987/88
