= 22nd Old Boys F.C. =

22nd Old Boys
- Full name: 22nd Old Boys Football Club
- Nickname: The 22nd
- Founded: 1952
- Ground: Clarendon Sports Complex
- Manager: Brian Kirker
- League: Northern Amateur Football League

22nd Old Boys Football Club, referred to as 22nd Old Boys or simply The 22nd, are a Northern Irish football club based in Ballysillan, Belfast, Northern Ireland. The 22nd Old Boys were founded in 1952, and they play in the Northern Amateur Football League. The 22nd Ladies play in the NIWFL.

The 22nd are a part of the County Antrim & District FA. The club play in the Irish Cup.

They play their home games at Clarendon Sports Complex in Sommerdale Park. Their home colours are gold and silver.

== History ==
The 22nd Old Boys joined the NAFL for the 2017/18 season.

In 2020, Manager Brian Kirker was recognised for promoting positive wellbeing at the club, and has volunteered with TAMHI (Tackling Awareness of Mental Health Issues). He was celebrated under a new initiative from The National Lottery and ITV

In 2025, Manager Brian Kirker, who started out playing for the under-15s, has spent three decades at the club, was nominated for the People’s Award in Irish FA Grassroots Football Awards for 2025.

In September 2025, 22nd Old Boys organized a cross-community tournament with Shamrock F.C., featuring over 250 players from various clubs to the tournament. Funds were raised by the NI Housing Executive. The 2nd tournament was won by the 22nd Old Boys.

== Honours ==
- Northern Amateur Football League
  - Cochrane Corry Cup
    - 2022-23
- Other competitions
  - Belfast Super League
    - Tournament 2
      - 2025
  - Ian Boyd Memorial Trophy
    - 2025
