= Colin Valley F.C. =

Association football club in Northern Ireland

Colin Valley
- Full name: Colin Valley Football Club
- Nickname: CVFC
- Founded: 1995
- Ground: Good Shepherd Road, Belfast
- League: NAFL Division 1B
- 2017–18: NAFL Division 1B, 9th

Colin Valley Football Club is an Irish Intermediate Level Football club based in Poleglass, Belfast. As of 2025, the club was playing in Division 1B of the Northern Amateur Football League.

Colin Valley FC were crowned Champions of Division 1C in 2014 earning promotion to 1B where they have played for the next 4 seasons.

The club's reserve team plays in Division 3b after gaining promotion in 2017 and they have a third team playing in Division 1 of the Down Area Winter League.

The club, which was founded in 1995 and plays at Colin Valley Park, Club colours are now Sky Blue for the senior section - and Purple for the Junior Section. also has junior teams from under-10 through under-19.

The club participates in the Irish Cup.

== Honours ==
- Northern Amateur Football League: 1C
  - 2014–15
