= Taughmonagh Young Men F.C. =

Taughmonagh Young Men
- Full name: Taughmonagh Young Men Football Club
- Founded: 1960
- Ground: Newforge Country Club
- League: Northern Amateur Football League

Taughmonagh Young Men Football Club, referred to as Taughmonagh Young Men or simply Taughmonagh, is a Northern Irish, intermediate football club playing in the Northern Amateur Football League. The club is based in Taughmonagh, Belfast, Northern Ireland and was formed in 1960. They are a part of the County Antrim & District FA. The club plays in the Irish Cup.

== History ==
On Boxing Day 2015, Taughmonagh won the Ironside Cup 2–1, with Barry Bloomer scoring the late winner at Stanley Park.

In 2024, Taughmonagh won back-to-back promotions, scoring 102 goals and going unbeaten in the 2023/24 season.

== Badge, colours and ground ==
The Taughmonagh F.C. badge features the Red Hand of Ulster, used to represent the unionist community of Taughmonagh. Their home colours are all blue. They play their home games at Newforge Country Club.

== Honours ==
- Northern Amateur Football League
  - NAFL Division 2C
    - 2022–23
  - NAFL Division 2B
    - 2023–24
- South Antrim League
  - Ironside Cup
    - 2014/15
