= 4th Newtownabbey F.C. =

4th Newtownabbey
- Full name: 4th Newtownabbey Football Club
- Nicknames: The 4th, Old Boys
- Founded: 1988
- Ground: Nortel Factory Ground
- Manager: Stevie Houston
- League: Northern Amateur Football League

4th Newtownabbey Football Club, referred to as 4th Newtownabbey, or simply The 4th, is a Northern Irish, intermediate football club playing in Division 2B of the Northern Amateur Football League. The 4th Newtownabbey Reserves play in the NAFL Reserves League. The club is based in Newtownabbey, County Antrim. 4th Newtownabbey was established in 1988. They are a part of the County Antrim Football Association. The club plays in the Irish Cup.

4th Newtownabbey play at the Nortel Factory Ground at Monkstown Gardens. They previously played at Three Mile Water Playing Fields. Their home colours are red and black.

In 2022, 4th Newtownabbey participated in the Irish Football Association's amateur games festival.

== 4th Newtownabbey Boy's Brigade and academy ==
The club also have Boy's Brigade and junior sides under the 4th Newtownabbey Academy. The 4th Newtownabbey Boy's Brigade is affiliated with Ballyhenry Presbyterian Church, also located in Newtownabbey.

== Honours ==
Northern Amateur Football League

- NAFL Division 2C
  - 2007/8
- NAFL Division 3B Title
  - 2013/14
- NAFL Division 3C Title
  - 2011/12

Boy's Brigade

- Masterteam title
  - 2018/19
- Company Football National Champions
  - 2022/23
