= BUFC =

BUFC is an abbreviation referring to one of the following football clubs:

- Backwell United F.C.
- Bali United F.C.
- Ballinamallard United F.C.
- Ballycastle United F.C.
- Ballymena United F.C.
- Ballymoney United F.C.
- Ballynahinch United F.C.
- Banbury United F.C.
- Bangalore United F.C.
- Bangkok United F.C.
- Barn United F.C.
- Basford United F.C.
- Basildon United F.C.
- Bay United F.C.
- Bedworth United F.C.
- Bessbrook United F.C.
- Bexhill United F.C.
- Biggleswade United F.C.
- Birstall United F.C.
- Blandford United F.C.
- Bonagee United F.C.
- Boston United F.C.
- Brandon United F.C.
- Brightlingsea United F.C.
- Bulls United F.C.
- Buriram United F.C.
