= Beann Mhádagháin F.C. =

Beann Mhádagháin
- Full name: Beann Mhádagháin Football Club
- Founded: 2010
- Ground: Valley Leisure Playing Fields
- Chairman: Jim Mackle
- Manager: Declan Hackett
- League: Northern Amateur Football League

Beann Mhádagháin F.C. (Cavehill F.C. in English) is a Northern Irish, intermediate football club playing in the Northern Amateur Football League. The club was founded in 2010, and is based in north Belfast, Northern Ireland. They are a part of the County Antrim FA.

The club plays in the Irish Cup and IFA Junior Cup. The Beann Mhádagháin lls also play in the NAFL reserves leagues.

In 2019, Beann Mhádagháin competed in the Foyle Cup.

In 2022, the IIs made NAFL history when manager Damien Cole made it twenty wins from twenty to win the 2B division title. In the same season, the club also seen the reserves win the Division 3E league.

== Colours and badge ==
Beann Mhádagháin play in red and white candy stripes., The club play their home games at the Valley Leisure Playing Fields, which is a 3G pitch. The badge features red and white checkers and displays Belfast's Cavehill. The club's motto is "hasta la victoria siempre", a Spanish political slogan for "Ever onward to victory" or "Until victory, always!".

== Honours ==
- Northern Amateur Football League
  - NAFL Division 2C
    - 2018/19
  - NAFL Division 2B
    - 2021/22
  - Division 3E
    - 2021/22 (reserves)
