= Holywood F.C. =

Association football club in Northern Ireland

Holywood
- Full name: Holywood Football Club
- Nickname: The Wood
- Founded: 1983
- Ground: Spafield Park, Holywood
- Chairman: Michael Geddis
- Manager: Glen Upton/Jonny McKay
- League: NAFL Division 1A

Holywood Football Club is a Northern Irish intermediate football club playing in Division 1A of the Northern Amateur Football League. The club is based in Holywood, County Down, and was founded in 1983 by the amalgamation of Loughview Star (founded 1961) and Holywood Town (founded 1972).

The club has four Senior Men's teams and a Senior Ladies team, both of which successfully completed their first competitive season. In season 2023/24 the First Team were promoted into Division 1A; the Second team finished in a Fourth league position and the Third team were promoted from Division 2 to Division 1 of the North Down Winter league. A newly formed Fourth team narrowly missed out on promotion, only beaten on goal difference in their first season.

== Honours ==
=== Intermediate honours ===
- NAFL 1A: 1
  - 2025–26

=== Junior honours ===
- Irish Junior Cup: 1
  - 1989–90
- NAFL 3C: 1
  - 2025–26

Virtual Irish Cup Winners - 2022/2023 Season
