= Rooftop F.C. =

Rooftop
- Full name: Rooftop Football Club
- Founded: 1973
- Ground: Grove Playing Fields
- League: Northern Amateur Football League

Rooftop Football Club, referred to simply as Rooftop, are a Northern Irish football club based in North Belfast, Northern Ireland. Rooftop F.C. were founded in 1973, and they play in the Northern Amateur Football League. Rooftop II's play in the NAFL Reserves League. Rooftop are a part of the County Antrim & District FA. The club play in the Irish Cup.

Rooftop F.C. play their home games at Grove Playing Fields. Their home colours are blue and black. The crest features its colours and the Red Hand of Ulster.

== History ==
Rooftop Football Club was founded in 1973, and started out playing in the Belfast & District Football League. They were admitted into the Northern Amateur Football League in 2001.

== Honours ==
- Northern Amateur Football League
  - Division 2C
    - 2005/6
- Belfast & District Football League
  - Junior Senior Cup
    - 1981/82
