= Bangor Swifts F.C. =

Association football club in Northern Ireland

Bangor Swifts
- Full name: Bangor Swifts Football Club
- Ground: St Columbanus College, Bangor, County Down
- League: NAFL Division 1C

Bangor Swifts Football Club is a Northern Irish, intermediate football club playing in Division 1C of the Northern Amateur Football League. The club is based in Bangor. The club plays in the Irish Cup. The reserves compete in the Down Area Winter Football League.

== Junior honours ==
- Northern Amateur Football League 2B: 1
  - 2007/08
