= Immaculata F.C. =

Northern Irish soccer club

Immaculata
- Full name: Immaculata Football Club
- Nickname: The Mac
- Founded: 1944
- Ground: Grosvenor Recreation Centre, Belfast
- Chairman: Jim McKee
- Manager: Brian McCaul
- League: NAFL Premier Division
- 2022–23: NAFL Premier Division, 5th

Immaculata Football Club is an intermediate football club based in west Belfast and playing in the Premier Division of the Northern Amateur Football League. The club plays in sky blue and plays home games at Grosvenor Recreation Centre (The Cage) on the Grosvenor Road in West Belfast close to the Westlink. Immaculata FC is currently managed by Brian McCaul.

== History ==
The club was established in 1944 by the Legion of Mary as a football and boxing club. Although they were initially most noted for their youth teams Immaculata's seniors also played initially in the now defunct Lisburn League and then in the Dunmurry League (now the Belfast & District League).

They play in the Northern Amateur Football League (NAFL), and have spent most of their time in the league's lower divisions. However, in 2008–09 the club won the NAFL's Division 2C, the first of what was five back to back title wins and resultant promotions. They won 2B the following year and clinched the 2A title, and promotion from the junior to intermediate grade in 2010–11. This was followed by victory in Division 1C in 2011–12 before they secured the Division 1B title in 2012–13. They were promoted again the following season, finishing as runners-up in Division 1A for a sixth consecutive promotion.

The club qualified for the Irish Cup for the first time in 2011–12, reaching the fourth round by overcoming Bourneview Young Men, Magherafelt Sky Blues and Crumlin Star before losing to Banbridge Town. They made the fifth round the following year, losing to Ards, having earlier defeated Markethill Swifts in the first round, Newbuildings United in the second round, Dunmurry Recreation in the third and Ards Rangers in the fourth.

In 2015–16 Immaculata won the NAFL Premier Division. Under manager Kevin Lawlor the club won 23 of their 26 league games to finish seven points clear of closest challengers Ards Rangers.

== Honours ==
=== Intermediate honours ===
- Irish Intermediate Cup: 1
  - 2023-24
- Northern Amateur Football League: 1
  - 2015-16
- Clarence Cup: 5
  - 2008–09, 2010–11, 2014–15, 2015–16, 2016–17

=== Junior honours ===
- Irish Junior Cup: 3
  - 2008–09, 2009–10, 2010–11
- County Antrim Junior Shield: 2
  - 1994–95, 2008–09
