= Northern Amateur Football League =

Association football league in Northern Ireland

- Founded: 1923
- Country: Northern Ireland
- Level on pyramid: 4–7 (Premier to Division 1C only)
- Promotion to: NCL League Two (to be created in 2027)
- Domestic cup(s): Irish Cup; IFA Intermediate Cup
- Current champions: Derriaghy Cricket Club F.C. (2025–26)
- Most championships: East Belfast (10 titles)

The Northern Amateur Football League, also known as the Northern Amateur League and often simply as the Amateur League, is an association football league in Northern Ireland. It contains 13 divisions. These comprise four intermediate sections: the Premier Division, Division 1A, Division 1B and Division 1C; three junior sections: Division 2A, Division 2B and Division 2C; and six reserve sections.

== Clubs in membership (2025-26) ==
=== Intermediate ===
Premier Division

- Abbey Villa
- Ards Rangers
- Comber Recreation
- Crumlin Star
- Derriaghy Cricket Club
- Drumaness Mills
- Dromara Village
- Dunmurry Young Men
- East Belfast
- Lisburn Rangers
- Holywood
- Immaculata
- Islandmagee
- Rosario Youth
Division 2A
- 22nd Old Boys
- Bangor Swifts
- Bangor Y.M.
- Barn United
- Beann Mhádagháin FC
- Belfast Celtic YM
- Donaghadee F.C.
- Ford F.C.
- Kelvin Old Boys
- Queens Grads.
- St Mary's
- St Teresas Y.C.
- Taughmonagh YM FC

Division 1A

- 1st Bangor Old Boys
- Albert Foundry
- Aquinas
- Crumlin United
- Finaghy
- Greenisland
- Larne Technical Old Boys
- Shankill United
- Dunmurry Recreation
- Sirocco Works
- St Oliver Plunkett
- Mossley
- Kilmore Recreation
- Willowbank
Division 2B
- 4th Newtownabbey F.C.
- Carryduff Colts
- Celtic Bhoys
- Clonduff FC
- Lower Shankill FC
- NI Civil Service F.C.
- Newhill FC
- Newtownbreda F.C.
- Queens University 11's
- Ravenhill YM FC
- St Patricks Y.M. F.C.
- Tullymore Swifts
- Ulster University

Division 1B

- Bryansburn Rangers
- Ballynahinch Olympic
- Colin Valley
- Downshire Young Men
- Dundonald
- Shamrock
- Newcastle Town
- 18th Newtownabbey Old Boys
- Rosemount Rec
- St Luke's
- St Marys
- St Matthews
- Killyleagh Youth
- Woodvale
Division 2C
- Antrim Rovers
- Ballysillan Swifts
- Belvoir FC
- Clonard FC
- Cregagh Wanderers FC
- Cumann Spóirt an Phobail
- Greenwell Star FC
- Groomsport
- Kircubbin F.C.
- Rooftop
- Réalta naCromóige
- Sandy Row
- St Malachys OB Youth FC
- Whitehead Eagles

Division 1C

- Bangor Amateurs
- Ballynahinch United
- Ballywalter Recreation
- Bangor Swifts
- Bloomfield
- Grove United
- Orangefield Old Boys
- Portavogie Rangers
- Portaferry Rovers
- Malachians
- Saintfield United
- Shorts
- Suffolk
- Tullycarnet
Division 3 - reserve teams

== Format ==
The league season lasts from August to May with each club playing the others twice, once at their home ground and once at that of their opponents. Teams receive three points for a win and one point for a draw. No points are awarded for a loss. Teams are ranked by total points, then goal difference, and then goals scored. At the end of each season, the team that finishes in first place in the Premier division is crowned league champions.

=== Premier Division ===
There are 14 clubs in the Premier Division, each playing a total of 26 games. The two lowest-placed teams are relegated to Division 1A. The league champions can be promoted to the NIFL Premier Intermediate League, providing they meet the admittance requirements.

=== Division 1A ===
There are 14 clubs. The two highest-placed teams are promoted into the Premier Division whilst the two lowest-placed teams are relegated to Division 1B.

=== Division 1B ===
There are 14 clubs. The two highest-placed teams are promoted to Division 1A and the two lowest-placed teams are relegated to Division 1C.

=== Division 1C ===
This division was added to the Amateur League for the 2009/10 season. It now consists of 14 teams who will each play a total of 26 matches. The two top-placed teams at the end of the season will be promoted to Division 1B.

=== Second Division ===
There are three sections within the Second Division, which has junior status: Division 2A, Division 2B and Division 2C. The top team in Division 2A at the end of the season can be promoted into the Intermediate section as long as their grounds meet intermediate standards.

=== Third Division ===
The Third Division is for reserve sides of teams in the first and second divisions. It has six sections: 3A to 3F. The exception is Queens University Belfast A.F.C, as their first time compete in the NIFL Premier Intermediate League. they are therefore eligible to field a reserves team above the Third Division.

== History ==
The League was founded 4 July 1923 at a meeting of fourteen clubs at the Clarence Place Hall, Donegall Square East, Belfast, initially as a league for teams from public bodies, private associations, schools and firms. It was affiliated to the Irish Football Association (IFA) as a junior league in August. The first season was 1923/24 and by the time the first fixtures were played on 22 September, there were 16 member clubs. The Co-operative and C.P.A. were tied at the top of the table, but the Co-operative won a play-off to be crowned the first Amateur League champions.

A knock-out competition – the Clarence Cup – was also inaugurated in the first season, and the first winners were C.P.A., who beat the Co-operative 2–1 in a replay after a 0–0 draw.

The League's first representative game was played on 26 January 1924 against the Minor League at the Oval, and was a 6–1 win for the Amateur League. In 1932, the League played its first representative match outside Northern Ireland: a 3–3 draw against the Scottish Juvenile FA at Celtic Park, Glasgow. This became an annual fixture, which lasted until 1939, only to be halted by the Second World War. Subsequently, annual fixtures have resumed, first with the Scottish Amateur League and, since 1978–1979 with the Scottish Amateur F.A., competing for the Britton Rosebowl.

During the next few years, the League gained intermediate status, and a junior-status second division was added in 1926. By 1930, there were 30 clubs in membership. In 1932–1933, the League's strength was demonstrated when Dunville's became the first Amateur League team to win the Irish Intermediate Cup, and in 1938–1939 when Sirocco Works won the Steel & Sons Cup.

In the 1936–1937 season, a new competition was introduced: the Border Regiment Cup (commonly the Border Cup), which was to become the perhaps League's most prestigious trophy as it established a traditional Christmas final. The cup was presented to the league by the team of the Border Regiment, stationed at Palace Barracks, which had been a member of the League since 1933, and which was nearing the end of its tour of duty. The first winners were Sirocco Works, who beat Whitehouse Recreation Club 4–0 in the final.

After the Second World War, the league expanded its membership and the second division was split into two – Division 2A and Division 2B – in 1947. Division 2C was added in 1950. In 1961, Division 2A was elevated to intermediate status as Division 1B, with the top division renamed as Division 1A. Divisions 2B and 2C consequently became 2A and 2B respectively. The next year, 1962, the league expanded again and a new Division 2C was added, making a total of five divisions.

In 1963, it was decided that the Border Cup should be confined to teams in the First Division, and a new knock-out competition – the Cochrane Corry Cup – was instituted for the Second Division teams. The Clarence Cup is contested by teams of both divisions.

From the 1970–1971 season, automatic promotion and relegation within each division was introduced, and in the following season a new Third Division was added for the reserve teams of member clubs. In 1971 Division 2C was abolished, but re-established again in 1975. In 1973 a second reserve section was formed and the Third Division was thus divided into Division 3A and Division 3B. Division 3C was added in 1980, Division 3D in 1986 and Division 3E in 1991. There is now a Division 3F.

The League had been growing, particularly since the 1960s, and the milestone of 100 teams in membership was achieved in 1981. (By 1997–1998, there were 144 teams in membership.) In 1985, the League secured a sponsorship deal with Smithwick's.

In 1986, the intermediate First Division was expanded into three sections with the addition of Division 1C. From 1991, the intermediate sections were renamed as the Premier Division, Division 1A and Division 1B. Minimum standards were set for clubs' grounds as a condition of membership of the Premier Division, with promotion only available to those clubs whose facilities measured up.

== List of champions ==
- 1923–24 Co-operative
- 1924–25 North Cricket Club
- 1925–26 North Cricket Club
- 1926–27 Sirocco Works
- 1927–28 Shaftesbury
- 1928–29 Shaftesbury
- 1929–30 Holm Factory
- 1930–31 Dunville's
- 1931–32 Dunville's
- 1932–33 Dunville's
- 1933–34 Dunville's
- 1934–35 Sirocco Works
- 1935–36 Sirocco Works
- 1936–37 Sirocco Works
- 1937–38 Sirocco Works
- 1938–39 Sirocco Works
- 1939–40 Sirocco Works
- 1940–41 Victoria Works
- 1941–42 Victoria Works United
- 1942–43 Victoria Works United
- 1943–44 Shankill Young Men
- 1944–45 Shankill Young Men
- 1945–46 Shankill Young Men
- 1946–47 Queen's Island Woodworkers
- 1947–48 Sirocco Works
- 1948–49 Carrick Rangers
- 1949–50 East Belfast
- 1950–51 Musgrave
- 1951–52 Carrick Rangers
- 1952–53 East Belfast
- 1953–54 East Belfast
- 1954–55 East Belfast
- 1955–56 East Belfast
- 1956–57 Short Brothers & Harland
- 1957–58 Short Brothers & Harland
- 1958–59 Short Brothers & Harland
- 1959–60 Short Brothers & Harland
- 1960–61 Albert Foundry [I]
- 1961–62 Chimney Corner
- 1962–63 East Belfast
- 1963–64 East Belfast
- 1964–65 St Elizabeth's
- 1965–66 East Belfast
- 1966–67 Albert Foundry [I]
- 1967–68 Islandmagee
- 1968–69 Chimney Corner
- 1969–70 Chimney Corner
- 1970–71 Royal Ulster Constabulary
- 1971–72 International Computers Limited
- 1972–73 Royal Ulster Constabulary
- 1973–74 Chimney Corner
- 1974–75 Chimney Corner
- 1975–76 Barn United
- 1976–77 Downpatrick Rec.
- 1977–78 Downpatrick Rec.
- 1978–79 Harland & Wolff Welders
- 1979–80 Dunmurry Rec
- 1980–81 Downpatrick Rec.
- 1981–82 Drumaness Mills
- 1982–83 Standard Telephones & Cables
- 1983–84 Drumaness Mills
- 1984–85 Killyleagh Youth
- 1985–86 Cromac Albion
- 1986–87 Cromac Albion
- 1987–88 Dunmurry Rec
- 1988–89 Drumaness Mills
- 1989–90 Short Brothers
- 1990–91 Harland & Wolff Sports
- 1991–92 Dunmurry Rec
- 1992–93 Killyleagh Youth
- 1993–94 East Belfast
- 1994–95 Crumlin United
- 1995–96 Northern Telecom
- 1996–97 Northern Telecom
- 1997–98 Ards Rangers
- 1998–99 Dunmurry Rec
- 1999–00 Killyleagh Youth
- 2000–01 Killyleagh Youth
- 2001–02 Killyleagh Youth
- 2002–03 Killyleagh Youth
- 2003–04 Killyleagh Youth
- 2004–05 Killyleagh Youth
- 2005–06 Newington Youth
- 2006–07 Albert Foundry [II]
- 2007–08 Downpatrick
- 2008–09 Newington Youth
- 2009–10 Newington Youth
- 2010–11 Newington Youth
- 2011–12 Ards Rangers
- 2012–13 Newington Youth
- 2013–14 Drumaness Mills
- 2014–15 Ards Rangers
- 2015–16 Immaculata
- 2016–17 Crumlin Star
- 2017–18 Crumlin Star
- 2018–19 Crumlin Star
- 2019–20 Withheld due to Covid
- 2020–21 Withheld due to Covid
- 2021–22 Rathfriland Rangers
- 2022–23 Rathfriland Rangers
- 2023–24 East Belfast
- 2024–25 Comber Rec

=== Performance by club ===
Team	No. of Wins	Winning years
East Belfast	10	1949–50, 1952–53, 1953–54, 1954–55, 1955–56, 1962–63, 1963–64, 1965–66, 1993–94, 2023-24
Sirocco Works	8	1926–27, 1934–35, 1935–36, 1936–37, 1937–38, 1938–39, 1939–40, 1947–48
Killyleagh Youth	8	1984–85, 1992–93, 1999–2000, 2000–01, 2001–02, 2002–03, 2003–04, 2004–05
Dunville's**	6	1927–28, 1928–29, 1930–31, 1931–32, 1932–33, 1933–34
Chimney Corner	5	1961–62, 1968–69, 1969–70, 1973–74, 1974–75
Short Brothers†	5	1956–57, 1957–58, 1958–59, 1959–60, 1989–90
Newington Youth	5	2005–06, 2008–09, 2009–10, 2010–11, 2012–13
Dunmurry Rec	4	1979–80, 1987–88, 1991–92, 1998–99
Drumaness Mills	4	1981–82, 1983–84, 1988–89, 2013–14
Victoria Works United*	3	1940–41, 1941–42, 1942–43
Shankill Young Men	3	1943–44, 1944–45, 1945–46
Downpatrick Rec.	3	1976–77, 1977–78, 1980–81
Nortel‡	3	1982–83, 1995–96, 1996–97
Ards Rangers	3	1997–98, 2011–12, 2014–15
Crumlin Star	3	2016–17, 2017–18, 2018–19
North Cricket Club	2	1924–25, 1925–26
Carrick Rangers	2	1948–49, 1951–52
Albert Foundry [I]	2	1960–61, 1966–67
Royal Ulster Constabulary	2	1970–71, 1972–73
Cromac Albion	2	1985–86, 1986–87
Rathfriland Rangers	2	2021–22, 2022–23
Co-operative	1	1923–24
Comber Rec	1	2024–25
Holm Factory	1	1929–30
Queen's Island Woodworkers	1	1946–47
Musgrave	1	1950–51
St Elizabeth's	1	1964–65
Islandmagee	1	1967–68
International Computers Limited	1	1971–72
Barn United	1	1975–76
Harland & Wolff Welders	1	1978–79
Harland & Wolff Sports	1	1990–91
Crumlin United	1	1994–95
Downpatrick	1	2007–08
Immaculata	1	2015–16

* Including one as Victoria Works.
** Including two as Shaftesbury.
† Including four as Short Brothers & Harland.
‡ One as Standard Telephones & Cables and two as Northern Telecom.

== Cup competitions ==
There are two cup competitions at intermediate level: the Border Regiment Cup, more commonly referred to as the Border Cup, the final of which is played during the Christmas period, is a knock-out competition for First Division clubs. The Clarence Cup is a knock-out competition for all clubs (encompassing both the First and Second Divisions).

== List of Clarence Cup winners ==
- 1923–24 CPA
- 1924–25 Ophir
- 1925–26 Sirocco Works
- 1926–27 Sirocco Works
- 1927–28 Shaftesbury
- 1928–29 Shaftesbury
- 1929–30 Shaftesbury
- 1930–31 Dunville's
- 1931–32 Ewarts
- 1932–33 Cliftonville Strollers
- 1933–34 49th (Scouts) Old Boys
- 1934–35 Border Regiment
- 1935–36 Willowfield
- 1936–37 Whitehouse Rec
- 1937–38 Whitehouse Rec
- 1938–39 Sirocco Works
- 1939–40 Aircraft Works II
- 1940–41 Victoria Works
- 1941–42 Victoria Works United
- 1942–43 Victoria Works United
- 1943–44 Sirocco Works
- 1944–45 Shankill Young Men
- 1945–46 Sirocco Works
- 1946–47 East Belfast
- 1947–48 Sirocco Works
- 1948–49 Cogry Mills
- 1949–50 East Belfast
- 1950–51 East Belfast
- 1951–52 East Belfast
- 1952–53 Wolfhill Rec
- 1953–54 Balmoral Rec
- 1954–55 Balmoral Rec
- 1955–56 Chimney Corner
- 1956–57 East Belfast
- 1957–58 Comber Rec
- 1958–59 Ewarts
- 1959–60 Harland & Wolff S.M.D.
- 1960–61 Royal Ulster Constabulary
- 1961–62 Comber Rec
- 1962–63 Bethel Young Men
- 1963–64 Albert Foundry [I]
- 1964–65 Lisburn Rangers
- 1965–66 St Elizabeth's
- 1966–67 Albert Foundry [I]
- 1967–68 Dundonald
- 1968–69 Harland & Wolff Welders 'A'
- 1969–70 Chimney Corner
- 1970–71 Cup withheld
- 1971–72 RNAY
- 1972–73 Lisburn Rangers
- 1973–74 Standard Telephones & Cables
- 1974–75 Downpatrick Rec.
- 1975–76 Barn United
- 1976–77 Balmoral Rec
- 1977–78 Cromac Albion
- 1978–79 Downpatrick Rec.
- 1979–80 Cromac Albion
- 1980–81 Ballyclare Comrades Reserves
- 1981–82 Civil Service
- 1982–83 Ballyclare Comrades Reserves
- 1983–84 Ballyclare Comrades Reserves
- 1984–85 Carreras Rothmans
- 1985–86 Standard Telephones & Cables
- 1986–87 Harland & Wolff Sports
- 1987–88 Grove United
- 1988–89 Harland & Wolff Sports
- 1989–90 Rooftop
- 1990–91 Abbey Villa
- 1991–92 Harland & Wolff Sports
- 1992–93 Drumaness Mills
- 1993–94 Drumaness Mills
- 1994–95 Barn United
- 1995–96 Cup withheld
- 1996–97 Ballynahinch United
- 1997–98 Killyleagh Youth
- 1998–99 Comber Rec
- 1999–2000 F.C. Enkalon
- 2000–01 Killyleagh Youth
- 2001–02 Killyleagh Youth
- 2002–03 Bangor Amateurs
- 2003–04 Kilmore Rec
- 2004–05 Kilmore Rec
- 2005–06 Barn United
- 2006–07 East Belfast
- 2007–08 Islandmagee
- 2008–09 Immaculata
- 2009–10 Albert Foundry [II]
- 2010–11 Immaculata
- 2011–12 Derriaghy Cricket Club
- 2012–13 Crumlin Star
- 2013–14 Drumaness Mills
- 2014–15 Immaculata
- 2015–16 Immaculata
- 2016–17 Immaculata
- 2017–18 Crumlin Star
- 2018–19 East Belfast
- 2019-20 Withheld due to Covid
- 2020-21 Withheld due to Covid
- 2021-22 Withheld due to Covid
- 2022-23 Crumlin United
- 2023–24 Derriaghy Cricket Club
- 2024–25 Crumlin Star

• 2025 - 26 Islandmagee FC

=== Performance by club ===
Team	Wins	Winning years
East Belfast	7	1946–47, 1949–50, 1950–51, 1951–52, 1956–57, 2006–07, 2018–19
Sirocco Works	6	1925–26, 1926–27, 1938–39, 1943–44, 1944–45, 1947–48
Immaculata	5	2008–09, 2010–11, 2014–15, 2015–16, 2016–17
Dunville's*	4	1927–28, 1928–29, 1929–30, 1930–31
Victoria Works United**	3	1940–41, 1941–42, 1942–43
Balmoral Rec	3	1953–54, 1954–55, 1976–77
Ballyclare Comrades Reserves	3	1980–81, 1982–83, 1983–84
Harland & Wolff Sports	3	1986–87, 1988–89, 1991–92
Comber Rec	3	1957–58, 1961–62, 1998–99
Killyleagh Youth	3	1997–98, 2000–01, 2001–02
Barn United	3	1975–76, 1994–95, 2005–06
Drumaness Mills	3	1992–93, 1993–94, 2013–14
Crumlin Star	3	2012–13, 2017–18, 2024-25
Whitehouse Rec	2	1936–37, 1937–38
Ewarts	2	1931–32, 1958–59
Albert Foundry [I]	2	1963–64, 1966–67
Chimney Corner	2	1955–56, 1969–70
Lisburn Rangers	2	1964–65, 1972–73
Downpatrick Rec.	2	1974–75, 1978–79
Cromac Albion	2	1977–78, 1979–80
Standard Telephones & Cables	2	1973–74, 1985–86
Kilmore Rec	2	2003–04, 2004–05
Derriaghy Cricket Club	2	2011–12, 2023-24
CPA	1	1923–24
Ophir	1	1924–25
Cliftonville Strollers	1	1932–33
49th (Scouts) Old Boys	1	1933–34
Border Regiment	1	1934–35
Willowfield	1	1935–36
Aircraft Works II	1	1939–40
Shankill Young Men	1	1944–45
Cogry Mills	1	1948–49
Wolfhill Rec	1	1952–53
Harland & Wolff S.M.D.	1	1959–60
Royal Ulster Constabulary	1	1960–61
Bethel Young Men	1	1962–63
St Elizabeth's	1	1965–66
Dundonald	1	1967–68
RNAY	1	1971–72
Harland & Wolff Welders 'A'	1	1968–69
Civil Service	1	1981–82
Carreras Rothmans	1	1984–85
Grove United	1	1987–88
Rooftop	1	1989–90
Abbey Villa	1	1990–91
Ballynahinch United	1	1996–97
Bangor Amateurs	1	2002–03
Islandmagee	1	2007–08
Albert Foundry [II]	1	2009–10
Crumlin United	1	2022-23

* Including three as Shaftesbury.
** Including one as Victoria Works.

== List of Border Cup winners ==
Season	Winner	Score	Score	Runner-up	Notes
1936–37	Sirocco Works	4	0	Whitehouse Recreation
1937–38	Sirocco Works	2	1	Carnmoney Comrades
1938–39	Sirocco Works	3	1	Carnmoney Comrades
1939–40	Aircraft Works	3	1	49th (Scouts) Old Boys
1940–41	Victoria Works	4	0	North of Ireland Paper Mill
1941–42	Sirocco Works II	1	0	North of Ireland Paper Mill
1942–43	Victoria Works United	4	1	Shankill Young Men
1943–44	Belfast Abattoir	2	1	Scott's
1944–45	Sirocco Works	1	0	Queen's Island Woodworkers
1945–46	Sirocco Works	5	3	Carrick Rangers
1946–47	Short & Harland	3	1	Sirocco Works II
1947–48	Ormeau Rec	2	1	Hilden Rec
1948–49	Short & Harland	2	1	Dunmurry Rec	Replay after drawn game
1949–50	Albert Foundry [I]	3	1	Musgrave's	Replay after drawn game
1950–51	East Belfast	4	1	Musgrave's
1951–52	Wolfhill Rec	2	1	Sirocco Works	Replay after drawn game
1952–53	East Belfast	1	0	Astra
1953–54	Dunmurry Rec	2	1	Wolfhill Rec	Replay after drawn game
1954–55	Hilden Rec	2	0	East Belfast
1955–56	Short & Harland	2	1	Sirocco Works
1956–57	Comber Rec	3	2	Chimney Corner
1957–58	Comber Rec	1	0	Short & Harland
1958–59	Chimney Corner	1	0	Short & Harland
1959–60	Short & Harland	4	3	East Belfast
1960–61	Albert Foundry [I]	7	0	Sirocco Works
1961–62	Balmoral Recreation	2	1	St Elizabeth's
1962–63	Albert Foundry [I]	6	4	Short & Harland
1963–64	Islandmagee	1	0	Albert Foundry [I]
1964–65	Royal Ulster Constabulary	2	1	Islandmagee
1965–66	International Computers & Tabulators	2	1	St Elizabeth's
1966–67	Ards Rangers	3	0	Islandmagee
1967–68	Chimney Corner	3	1	Islandmagee
1968–69	Ewarts Rec	2	0	Royal Ulster Constabulary	Replay after drawn game
1969–70	Chimney Corner	2	1	Albert Foundry [I]
1970–71	Chimney Corner	2	1	Ards Rangers
1971–72	Chimney Corner	1	0	International Computers Limited
1972–73	Lisburn Rangers	2	1	Civil Service
1973–74	Chimney Corner	4	1	Royal Ulster Constabulary
1974–75	Chimney Corner	1	0	Standard Telephones & Cables
1975–76	Larne Tech Old Boys	2	1	Lisburn Rangers
1976–77	Downpatrick Rec.	7	1	Ards Rangers
1977–78	Drumaness Mills	1	0	Downpatrick Rec.
1978–79	Drumaness Mills	2	0	Barn United
1979–80	Ards Rangers			Larne Tech Old Boys	Won on penalties, replay after drawn game
1980–81	Drumaness Mills	4	1	Killyleagh Youth
1981–82	Short Brothers	2	2	Post Office Social Club	Won on penalties
1982–83	Standard Telephones & Cables	2	0	Post Office Social Club
1983–84	Short Brothers	-	-	-	Trophy awarded, no final played
1984–85	Killyleagh Youth	5	1	Barn United
1985–86	Standard Telephones & Cables	2	1	Sirocco Works
1986–87	Drumaness Mills	3	2	Killyleagh Youth
1987–88	Post Office Social Club	2	1	Newtownabbey Town
1988–89	Cromac Albion	2	1	Harland & Wolff Sports
1989–90	Ballynahinch United	2	2	British Telecom	Won on penalties
1990–91	Standard Telephones & Cables	1	0	Bangor Amateurs
1991–92	Dunmurry Rec	3	2	East Belfast
1992–93	Abbey Villa	5	0	Drumaness Mills
1993–94	FC Enkalon	3	3	1st Liverpool RR	Won on penalties
1994–95	1st Shankill Northern Ireland Supporters' Club	3	1	Islandmagee
1995–96	Coagh United	3	3	Islandmagee	Coagh won 4–2 on penalties
1996–97	Killyleagh Youth	2	0	Crumlin United
1997–98	Larne Tech Old Boys	2	1	Killyleagh Youth
1998–99	Islandmagee	3	1	Killyleagh Youth
1999–2000	Northern Telecom	2	0	Ards Rangers
2000–01	Crumlin United	3	0	Drumaness Mills
2001–02	Larne Tech Old Boys	-	-	-	Trophy awarded, no final played
2002–03	Killyleagh Youth	2	0	Kilmore Rec
2003–04	Killyleagh Youth	2	1	Downpatrick
2004–05	Knockbreda	2	1	Albert Foundry [II]
2005–06	Newington Youth	1	0	Wellington Rec
2006–07	Dunmurry Rec	3	0	Kilmore Rec
2007–08	Abbey Villa	3	2	Comber Rec
2008–09	Sport & Leisure Swifts	3	1	Kilmore Rec
2009–10	Grove United	1	1	Dromara Village	Grove won 7–6 on penalties
2010–11	Dromara Village	2	1	Nortel
2011–12	Crumlin Star	2	2	Islandmagee	Crumlin Star won 4–3 on penalties
2012–13	Crumlin Star	2	1	Rathfriland Rangers
2013–14	Albert Foundry [II]	2	0	Kilmore Rec
2014–15	Ards Rangers	3	1	Downpatrick
2015–16	East Belfast	1	0	Dundonald
2016–17	Rathfriland Rangers	2	1	Downpatrick
2017–18	Crumlin Star	4	1	Downpatrick
2018–19	Crumlin Star	1	1	Ballynahinch Olympic	AET, Crumlin Star won on penalties
2019–20	Ballynahinch Olympic	2	2	Rathfriland Rangers	AET, Ballynahinch Olympic won on penalties
2020–21	no competition due to COVID-19
2021-22	Derriaghy Cricket Club	1	0	Rathfriland Rangers
2022-23	Crumlin Star	1	0	Drumaness Mills
2023-24	Willowbank	6	1	Comber Rec
2024-25	Derriaghy Cricket Club	2	0	East Belfast|

=== Performance by club ===
Team	Wins	Winning years
Chimney Corner	7	1958–59, 1967–68, 1969–70, 1970–71, 1971–72, 1973–74, 1974–75
Short Brothers	7	1939–40, 1946–47, 1948–49, 1955–56, 1959–60, 1981–82, 1983–84
Sirocco Works	6	1936–37, 1937–38, 1938–39, 1941–42†, 1944–45, 1945–46
Crumlin Star	5	2011–12, 2012–13, 2017–18, 2018–19, 2022-23
Drumaness Mills	4	1977–78, 1978–79, 1980–81, 1986–87
Nortel	4	1982–83, 1985–86, 1990–91, 1999–00
Killyleagh Youth	4	1984–85, 1996–97, 2002–03, 2003–04
Albert Foundry [I]	3	1949–50, 1960–61, 1962–63
Larne Tech Old Boys	3	1975–76, 1997–98, 2001–02
Dunmurry Rec	3	1953–54, 1991–92, 2006–07
Ards Rangers	3	1966–67, 1979–80, 2014–15
East Belfast	3	1950–51, 1952–53, 2015–16
Victoria Works (United)	2	1940–41, 1942–43
Comber Rec	2	1956–57, 1957–58
Islandmagee	2	1963–64, 1998–99
Abbey Villa	2	1992–93, 2007–08
Albert Foundry [II]	2	1994–95, 2013–14
Derriaghy Cricket Club FC	2	2021-22, 2024-25
Belfast Abattoir	1	1943–44
Ormeau Rec	1	1947–48
Wolfhill Rec	1	1951–52
Hilden Rec	1	1954–55
Royal Ulster Constabulary	1	1964–65
International Computers & Tabulators	1	1965–66
Ewarts Rec	1	1968–69
Lisburn Rangers	1	1972–73
Downpatrick Rec.	1	1976–77
Ballynahinch United	1	1989–90
Post Office Social Club	1	1987–88
Cromac Albion	1	1988–89
FC Enkalon	1	1993–94
Coagh United	1	1995–96
Crumlin United	1	2000–01
Knockbreda	1	2004–05
Newington Youth	1	2005–06
Sport & Leisure Swifts	1	2008–09
Grove United	1	2009–10
Dromara Village	1	2010–11
Rathfriland Rangers	1	2016–17
Willowbank F.C.	1	2022-23

† includes 1 win by 2nd XI

== Sources ==
- H. Johnstone & G. Hamilton (n.d.) A Memorable Milestone: 75 Years of the Northern Amateur Football League
- M. Brodie (ed.) (n.d.) The Northern Ireland Soccer Yearbook 1999/2000.
- M. Brodie (ed.) (n.d.) The Northern Ireland Soccer Yearbook 2000/01.
- M. Brodie (ed.) (n.d.) The Northern Ireland Soccer Yearbook 2001/02.
- M. Brodie (ed.) (n.d.) The Northern Ireland Soccer Yearbook 2002/03.
- M. Brodie (ed.) (n.d.) The Northern Ireland Soccer Yearbook 2003/04.
- M. Brodie (ed.) (n.d.) The Northern Ireland Soccer Yearbook 2004/05.
- M. Brodie (ed.) (n.d.) The Northern Ireland Soccer Yearbook 2006/07.
- M. Brodie (ed.) (n.d.) The Northern Ireland Soccer Yearbook 2007/08.
- M. Brodie (ed.) (n.d.) The Northern Ireland Soccer Yearbook 2008/2009. Belfast:Ulster Tatler Publications
- Newington Youth Club F.C. Thursday 14 May 2009– Newington are the champions! Newington Football Club. Retrieved 15–05–09.
- Northern Amateur Football League
