= Shamrock F.C. =

- Nickname: Shamrock
- Founded: 2006
- Ground: Marrowbone Millennium Park
- Capacity: 180
- League: Northern Amateur Football League

Shamrock Football Club, referred to simply as Shamrock, is an intermediate football club playing in the Northern Amateur Football League. They are based in Ardoyne, Belfast, Northern Ireland. Shamrock were established 2006, and play their home games at Marrowbone Millennium Park, on Oldpark Road. They share the ground with Crumlin Star F.C. Shamrock F.C. play in the Irish Cup.

== History ==
Shamrock Football Club were established in 2006, and entered into the Belfast and District Football League up until 2014, when they joined the Northern Amateur Football League.

In 2014, Shamrock established a women's football team, Shamrock Ladies.

In July 2023, a pre-season friendly match again Ballysillan's Mossley F.C. was cancelled following sectarian threats prior to the match taking place at Ballysillan Leisure Centre.

In February 2024, Shamrock Football Club moved to an upgraded Marrowbone Millennium Park. The stadium cost £4.3 million, funded by funded by the Executive Office Urban Villages Initiative, Department for Communities and Belfast City Council. SDLP's Nichola Mallon helped the club secure this facility, including turnstiles following a 15-year wait and cut the tape at the opening.

== Colours and badge ==
Shamrock represents Irish Catholics that live in Ardoyne, and others from the Catholic community in Belfast. Shamrock Football Club play in traditional Celtic colours, green and white, adopting it from other Celtic football clubs, including Belfast Celtic, Lurgan Celtic and Glasgow Celtic.

The badge features an Irish clover leaf. The words "Ard Eoin" translates to the Irish origin name of Ardyone, "Eoin's Height", the west Belfast location of the club's origin. Also on the badge, the words "cumann peile na seamroige" translates to "the shamrock football association" from Irish.
