= Ballynahinch Olympic F.C. =

Association football club in Northern Ireland

Ballynahinch Olympic
- Full name: Ballynahinch Olympic Football Club
- Nickname: Olympic
- Founded: 1973
- Ground: Kilmore Playing Fields, Kilmore
- Chairman: Martin Sloan
- Manager: Liam Sloan and Barry Reid
- League: NAFL Division 1A
Home colours

Ballynahinch Olympic Football Club is a Northern Irish, intermediate football club based in Ballynahinch, County Down, playing its matches at Kilmore Playing Fields, Crossgar. They play in Division 1A of the Northern Amateur Football League. Club colours are Claret and Blue.

== History ==
Ballynahinch Olympic was formed in 1973 as a community based club to cater for the increased demand for soccer in the Ballynahinch area. Some of the founding members include Brendan McAllister, Brian Sloan, Sean Murnin, Jim Dornan and Barney Brown.

The idea came initially from Barney Brown in a work tea hut and it grew from there through the first training session and into the game. That first ever game was against a Plessey team and not surprisingly Olympic were beaten easily. The first pitch was in Magheralone and the first strip ever worn was red and white stripes. It was donated by a team in Belfast that were in the process of changing their strip.

== Newcastle League (1973-2009) ==
Ballynahinch won its first trophy in 1976/77 with the Newcastle League Division 2 title. A seconds team was formed the following season, while the first team completed an unbeaten campaign in Division 1.

From 1978 to 1990, Tom Potter led a period of sustained development, during which the club won the Division 2 and Harry Clarke Cup double and established its youth system.

In 1991/92, under Norman McCullough, the first team reached the Harry Clarke Cup semi-finals and the Junior Shield final, while the seconds won the Binian Cup under Eamon Wilson. In 1994 the club retired its No 11 shirt following the death of young first team player Mark Quinn.

Ballynahinch won the Bobby Dalzell Cup for the first time in 1997/98 under Damien Travers. After relegation in 2001/02, a new management team of Paul Sloan, Francie McGoran and later Steven Ward oversaw a major revival. The club won every league match in 2002/03, taking the Division 1 title and the Purdy Cup, then won the Premier Division in 2003/04 and retained it in 2004/05. The side also reached both major local cup finals in 2004/05, winning the Harry Clarke Cup.

Across this period, the seconds, thirds and youth teams played a central role in developing players and sustaining the club’s progress.

== Amateur League (2009-present) ==
Ballynahinch Olympic F.C. entered the Northern Amateur Football League in 2009/10 after five unsuccessful attempts, starting in Division 2C. The club rose quickly, winning Division 2B in 2011/12 and earning further promotion in 2012/13.

A strong 2015/16 campaign saw Ballynahinch win Division 1B under a management team led initially by Niall Murray and later by Barry Reid and Martin Hughes. The seconds secured a mid-table finish in the Newcastle League Premier Division, and new youth teams were formed at U17 and later U18 level.

Under Liam Sloan and Barry Reid, the first team consolidated in Division 1A and reached the Clarence Cup Semi-final. The period also included the death of youth player Matthew Davis, after whom a youth cup was renamed.

Promotion followed in 2017/18, with Ballynahinch winning Division 1A and reaching the NAFL Premier Division for the first time. The seconds reached the Bobby Dalzell Cup final, and a thirds team was added.

In 2018/19 Ballynahinch finished fourth in the Premier Division and reached the Border Cup final. The seconds won promotion as champions, while the thirds finished mid-table.

Ballynahinch kept the same management team for 2019/20 and opened the league campaign with 12 straight wins. The first team reached the Border Cup final after defeating Shankill United, while the seconds reached the Bobby Dalzell Cup final for the third consecutive year. The first team beat Rathfriland Rangers on penalties at Seaview after a 2–2 draw AET, securing the club's first Border Cup. Ballynahinch were top of the league when the season ended early in March 2020 due to the pandemic. The seconds were mid-table in their return to the Premier Division, but their Bobby Dalzell Cup final was cancelled after repeated postponements caused by weather and the pandemic, with the competition ultimately declared void.
