= Abbey Villa F.C. =

Association football club in Northern Ireland

Abbey Villa
- Full name: Abbey Villa Football Club
- Founded: 1955 (as Millisle United)
- Ground: Adams Park, Millisle
- Chairman: Gary Pitman
- Manager: Michael Doran
- League: Northern Amateur Football League Premier Division
- 2023-24: NAFL Division 1A, 1st (Champions)
Home colours

Abbey Villa Football Club is a Northern Irish intermediate football club currently playing in the Premier Division of the Northern Amateur Football League. The club was formed in 1955 as Millisle United. The team currently play their home matches at Adams Park on Abbey Road, Millisle. Under the management of Jonathan Busby, Villa field three adult men's teams . As well as the first team, there is a second team playing in the NAFL Division 3C, third team in the Down Area League Division 1a and a fourth team in third team in the Down Area League Division 2A. They also have a strong youth system with over a dozen teams and very dedicated team of youth coaches.

== Club history ==
The club was formed in 1955 by founding members Thomas Waugh (known locally as the unofficial mayor of Millisle) and Lennie Bennett along with his brothers Nelson, Tom, Raymond and Norman. The team, then known as Millisle United played its first season in the Cardy League. The following season they played in the Irish Churches League under the name of Millisle Presbyterian. In 1962, Thomas Waugh followed the advice of fellow club chairman Herbie Johnstone and applied to join the Northern Amateur Football League.

Abbey Villa remained in the Junior section of the NAFL until their memorable season of 1992–93. The club had just moved into their new grounds at Adams Park (named after then manager Brian Adams) and on its debut season saw the club win Division 1B by 11 points and lift the Border Regiment Cup after a 5–0 win in the final over Drumaness Mills. The club also had a successful Irish Cup run under Adams in 1995–96 reaching the last 16 before being knocked out by Lisburn Distillery.

Under the management of Graham and Mark Bailie, they repeated their Cup run. Villa reached the Irish Cup 2007–08 they were knocked out of the sixth round after a narrow 1–0 defeat to Donegal Celtic. They also won the prestigious Border Regiment Cup, defeating Comber Rec 3–2 in the final. They finished the 2008–09 on 70 points, 15 points ahead of their nearest rivals, to claim the Division 1A title for the first time in club history and therefore gained promotion to the Premier Division.

== Honours ==
=== Intermediate honours ===
- Clarence Cup: 1
  - 1990–91
- Border Cup: 2
  - 1992–93, 2007–08
- NAFL 1A: 1
  - 2023–24
