= Derriaghy Cricket Club F.C. =

Association football club in Northern Ireland

Derriaghy Cricket Club
- Full name: Derriaghy Cricket Club Football Club
- Nicknames: The Tufties, The Waxies, The Seycon Aces
- Founded: 1982
- Ground: Seycon Park, Dunmurry
- Chairman: Iain Webb
- Manager: Owen Forsythe
- League: NAFL Premier Division
- 2025- 2026: NAFL Premier Division, 1st (Champions)

Derriaghy Cricket Club Football Club, often simply known as Derriaghy CC or Derriaghy Cricket Club, is a Northern Irish intermediate-level football club playing in the Premier Division of the Northern Amateur Football League. The club is based in Derriaghy, County Antrim, was formed in 1982 when the long-established Derriaghy Cricket Club decided to add a football section. It joined the Lisburn League before entering the Amateur League in 1987. Its home ground is Seycon Park in Derriaghy. The club also has a 2nd XI in Division 3A of the NAFL and a Youth Academy.

Current Squad:

- Jonah Nicholl GK
- Gareth Henderson RB
- Joe Reid CB
- Barry Moore CB
- Curtis Brown LB
- Timmy Brown LB/CM
- Jake Moore RW
- Marc Fell CM
- Micheal Collim CM
- Colin Crawford RW
- Nick Beta CF
- Jordan Shearer CF
- Martin McAvoy CM
- Neil Graham CF
- Ethan Taggart M
- Nicolas Napier CM
- Curtis Black CF
- Jordan Malone CB/CM
- Ben Hamill LB
- Thomas Roscoe CM

== Honours ==
=== Intermediate honours ===
- NAFL Premier Division: 1
  - 2025-26
- Steel & Sons Cup: 1
  - 2024–25
- Clarence Cup: 2
  - 2011–12, 2023–24
- Border Cup: 2
  - 2021-22, 2025-26
- NAFL 1A: 1
  - 2013–2014

=== Junior honours ===
- NAFL 2B: 2
  - 1994-95, 1997-98
