= Grove United F.C. =

Association football club in Northern Ireland

Grove United
- Full name: Grove United Football Club
- Ground: Shore Road Playing Fields, Belfast

Grove United Football Club is a Northern Irish intermediate football club playing in Division 1A of the Northern Amateur Football League. The club hails from north Belfast and began life as the 40th (Belfast BB) Old Boys, and was also known as Jennymount, changing its name in 1985. The club has enjoyed intermediate status since 1997. They are based at the Shore Road playing fields in the Greencastle suburb, a ground they share with Malachians.

== Honours ==
=== Intermediate honours ===
- Clarence Cup: 1
  - 1987–88
- Border Cup: 1
  - 2009–10

=== Junior honours ===
- County Antrim Junior Shield: 4
  - 1983–84, 1984–85, 1996–96, 1996–97
