= Kelvin Old Boys F.C. =

Kelvin Old Boys
- Full name: Kelvin Old Boys Football Club
- Nicknames: The Old Boys, The Kob
- Founded: 1975
- Stadium: Blanchflower Stadium
- Chairman: David Bowen
- League: Northern Amateur Football League

Kelvin Old Boys Football Club, referred to as Kelvin Old Boys, or simply Kelvin, as well as their nickname "The Old Boys" and "The Kob", is a Northern Irish football club based in South Belfast, Northern Ireland. Kelvin Old Boys were founded in 1975 through Kelvin High School until the school closed in 1988. They play in the Northern Amateur Football League. Kelvin Old Boys are a part of the County Antrim & District FA. The club play in the Irish Cup.

== History ==
Kelvin High School opened in 1958, situated on Rodent Street, South Belfast. It served the communities of Sandy Row, Donegall Road and "The Village". Popularity of football increased in the school in the 1970's. Pupils that left the school had arranged a meeting in 1973 to form an old boys football team, and birthed the Kelvin Old Boys in 1975.

The Old Boys entered the Dunmurry League for the 1975–76 season. The club's first manager was David Bowen, a former head boy at Kelvin High School, with Dennis Shields, a teacher at the school, serving as coach. Home games were played at the school, including training sessions. Bowen is now the club chairman.

In 1983, Kelvin Old Boys applied to play in the Northern Amateur Football League for the 1983/84 season, and won three leagues in a row. Following cup success and another league victory in 1988, it was announced that Kelvin High School would close in 1988, finishing up in 1989.

The club's training was moved to Olympia Leisure Centre, where it continues to take place to the present day. However, the club's home ground had to be moved out of its local area, first to Henry Jones Playing Fields and then to Dixon Park in East Belfast, where it remained for over 20 years.

In 2017, Kelvin Old Boys started fielding youth teams, referred to as Kelvin Youth.

In 2019, Linfield F.C. undertook a partnership with Kelvin Old Boys to play their home games at New Midgley Park the following season so they can once again play in South Belfast. They had been playing their home games at Dixon Park in East Belfast up until the partnership. Prior to this, they played at Kelvin High School in South Belfast up until its closure in 1988. This left them without a local home pitch for three decades.

Kelvin Old Boys currently play at Blanchflower Stadium.

In August 2025, Kelvin Old Boys announced their 50th Anniversary Dinner. It is scheduled to take place October 4 2025.

In May 2026, Kelvin Old Boys beat Queens Grads 3-1 in the Cochrane Corry Cup final at Seaview.

== Kelvin Sports Bar ==
Supporters meet at the Kelvin Sports Bar on St. George's Gardens, Sandy Row. It is also known as Kelvin Old Boys Social Club. After their cup victories the players celebrate at the sports bar.

== Honours ==
- Northern Amateur Football League
  - Division 2C
    - 1983/84
  - Division 2B
    - 1984/85
  - Division 2A
    - 1985/86, 1987/88
  - Division 2A
    - 1992/3
  - Cochrane Corry Cup
    - 1985/86, 2025/26
- County Antrim Football Association
  - Junior Shield
    - 1991/2, 2010/11
