= Lower Shankill F.C. =

Lower Shankill
- Full name: Lower Shankill Football Club
- Founded: 1993
- Ground: Hammer Playing Fields
- Chairman: Thomas "Tam" McMillan
- League: Northern Amateur Football League

Lower Shankill Football Club, referred to simply as Lower Shankill, is a Northern Irish, intermediate football club playing the Northern Amateur Football League. The club is based in Shankill, Belfast, Northern Ireland, and was formed in 1993. The club plays in the Irish Cup.

Lower Shankill play in black and yellow. Their home ground is the Hammer Playing Fields.

== History ==
In 2010, Lower Shankill joined the Northern Amateur Football League following success in the development leagues.

In 2025, the IFA referred a dispute involving Lower Shankill F.C. and Ulster University F.C. back to the NAFL for reconsideration. The appeal was centered on a postponed match where the club sought to be awarded the points due to a fixture involving the two clubs, the referee declared the pitch to be unplayable. Represented by Jamie Bryson, the club argued that the NAFL had not followed its own rules. The committee found a "lacuna," or a gap, in the league's byelaws regarding match postponements due to factors outside a home club's control. The committee ruled in favor of the club's appeal, quashing the original decision and directing the NAFL to reconsider the matter.
