= Downpatrick F.C. =

Association football club in Northern Ireland

Downpatrick FC
- Full name: Downpatrick Football Club
- Founded: 2001
- Ground: St. Dillon’s Park, St. Dillon’s Avenue, Downpatrick
- Chairman: Paul Moore
- League: NADAFL Premier Division
Home colours	Away colours

Downpatrick Football Club is an amateur, association football club based in Downpatrick, County Down, Northern Ireland, playing in the Premier Division of the Newcastle And District Amateur Football League. The club also has a 2nd team who compete Division 1 of the NADAFL as Downpatrick II, as well as a team in Division 2 under Downpatrick Academy.

== History ==
Downpatrick Football Club was founded over 50 years ago to provide a recreational outlet for patients and staff at Downshire Hospital. The hospital, the biggest employer in the town at that time, provided an excellent playing surface and covered accommodation for the large crowds attending the many friendly fixtures arranged, some of which were against senior opposition. When the club decided to play competitively they joined the Church Alliance League shortly after World War II. When the Alliance League ceased Downshire joined the Northern Amateur Football League in 1951, although their stay was brief, leaving in 1953. During the next 20 years Downshire returned to playing friendlies against opposition such as Distillery and Cliftonville from the senior ranks and a host of Amateur League Clubs. Throughout this period the team was backboned by Brian McConvey, Noel Galloway, Noel McKermitt, Michael Bohill, Brian Cheetham, the Healy brothers Pat and Brian, and goalkeeper Harry McCurry (father of Ciaran) who went on to gain full Amateur International Honours.

In the early 1970s the Hospital required the playing area and Grandstand to build an extension, relocating the footballers to their current site within the hospital complex. Downshire joined the Newcastle and District League in 1975 and by season 1979–80 they were winners of the 1st Division Championship and Harry Clarke Cup double. The Harry Clarke cup was retained in 1980–81 and to complete a very successful three-year period the 1st Division Championship was secured in 1981–82.

Another 1st Division Championship was won in 1989–90 before re-joining the Amateur League in 1991–92. They won Division 2C at the first attempt and the following year won Division 2B. Winning Division 2A was to prove too difficult for the next eight years despite the dedicated effort of managers such as Brian Cheetham, Ciaran McCurry and 'Skipper' McMullan. The appointment of John McCarthy and his assistant Sean Bell gave the club a fresh impetuous and the 2A Championship was won in season 2001–02. They also contested the County Antrim F.A. Junior Shield final that season, losing 2–0 to Raceview Rangers. By this time there had been changes within the hospital body, the Amateur League giving special dispensation for a change of name in 1999, to Downpatricks Hospitals F.C.

In Christmas 2003, Downpatricks Hospitals took part in the Border Cup final against their rivals Killyleagh, losing 2–1. However winning the championship in Division 1A brought a happy ending to the season and Premier League football back to Downpatrick for the first time in twenty years.

In 2006 Downpatrick started a ladies team in their first year; they were just finding their feet, but now they are a team on the up and making very good progress up the leagues and doing well in the cups.

In season 2005 McCarthy and Bell stepped down and Carl Flanaghan and Stephen Galbraith took over and in their first year finished 5th in the table. In season 2007–08 they won the Amateur Premier League title for the first time in 29 years and got to the last 16 in the Irish Cup. In season 2008/2009 they almost made it two titles in a row, only to lose out by a point.

Both managers stepped down at end for 2009 season to be replaced by David and Paul Stranney, who in their first couple of months reached the Steel & Sons Cup final on Christmas Day 2009, where they were defeated by their neighbours Kilmore 2–0 at Seaview, home of Irish Premier League side Crusaders.

Following the COVID-19 pandemic, the club entered the NADAFL, and in the 2022–23 season finished top of Division 1, one point ahead of Killough II's to claim the league title. In the same season, the club also overcame Ballynahinch YM 2–1 in the supplementary cup final to claim the league and cup double.

As of the 2023–24 season, the club will compete in the Premier Division of the NADAFL, with the newly formed 2nd team competing in Division 2.

== Honours ==
=== Intermediate honours ===
- Northern Amateur Football League: 1
  - 2007–08

=== Amateur honours ===
- Newcastle & District Amateur Football League Division 1: 1
  - 2022-23
- Newcastle & District Amateur Football League Division 1 Supplementary Cup: 1
  - 2022-23
