= Northern Ireland Civil Service F.C. =

Association football club in Northern Ireland

Civil Service
- Full name: Civil Service Football Club
- Nickname: Civil
- Chairman: Will Carrigan
- Manager: Dylan Simpson, Chris McMaster
- League: Northern Amateur Football League

Northern Ireland Civil Service is a football club which currently plays in 2B in the Northern Amateur Football League. The club is based at The Pavilion Stormont in Belfast. They Currently have 2 teams, the 1st playing in 2B and the 2nds playing in 3E. The club is connected to the Northern Ireland Civil Service. The club previously had intermediate status and played in the Irish Cup. It joined the Amateur League in 1951.

== Honours ==
=== Intermediate honours ===
- Clarence Cup: 1981–82
