= East Belfast F.C. =

Association football club in Northern Ireland

East Belfast
- Full name: East Belfast Football Club
- Nickname: The East
- Founded: 1929
- Ground: Inverary Park, Sydenham
- Manager: Hugh Sinclair
- League: NAFL Premier Division
- 2025/26: NAFL Premier Division, 1st (champions)
Home colours

East Belfast Football Club is a Northern Irish intermediate football club based in East Belfast and competing in the Premier Division of the Northern Amateur Football League (NAFL).

East Belfast FC is one of the longest-serving clubs in the Northern Amateur Football League (NAFL). The club has won the NAFL championship ten times.

The club have also enjoyed considerable success in the NAFL’s major cup competitions, lifting the Clarence Cup seven times and the Border Regiment Cup three times.

East Belfast FC have also tasted success in the prestigious Steel & Sons Cup, winning the competition three times — a significant achievement in Northern Irish intermediate football.

Throughout the club’s history, East Belfast FC have also won numerous other league titles and honours, including championships in Division 1A and Division 1B.

== Honours ==
=== Intermediate honours ===
- Steel & Sons Cup: 3
  - 1954–55, 1992–93, 2018–19
- Northern Amateur League: 10
  - 1949–50, 1952–53, 1953–54, 1954–55, 1955–56, 1962–63, 1963–64, 1965–66, 1993–94, 2023–24
- Northern Amateur Football League 1A: 3
  - 1991-92, 2006–07, 2016–17
- Northern Amateur Football League 1B: 1
  - 2014-15
- Clarence Cup: 7
  - 1946–47, 1949–50, 1950–51, 1951–52, 1956–57, 2006–07, 2018–19
- Border Cup: 3
  - 1950–51, 1952–53, 2015–16

=== Junior honours ===
- Irish Junior Cup: 1
  - 1943–44
- Walter Moore Cup
- 1986-87, 2017-18, 2018-19, 2022-23
- Templeton Cup
  - 1996-97, 2014-15

=== Awards ===
- NAFL Logan Johnston Cup & Malcolm Brodie Merit Award
  - 2024-25 - Daryl Evans
