= Malachians F.C. =

Association football club in Northern Ireland

Malachians
- Full name: Malachians Football Club
- Founded: 1963
- Ground: Shore Road Playing Fields, Belfast
- League: NAFL Premier Division
- 2017–18: NAFL Premier Division, 13th
Home colours

Malachians Football Club is an intermediate Northern Irish football club playing in the Premier Division of the Northern Amateur Football League. The club was formed in 1963 as the football section of the St Malachy's College Old Boys' Association, and joined the Amateur League in 1967, achieving intermediate status in 1977.

== Honours ==
- NAFL 1A: 1
  - 1995–96
