= Albert Foundry F.C. =

Association football club in Northern Ireland

Albert Foundry
- Full name: Albert Foundry Football Club
- Nicknames: Foundry, Colts, Berties, Mounty, Westies, The Gers
- Founded: 1924
- Ground: Paisley Park Sportsplex, Belfast
- Capacity: 125
- Chairman: Robert Young
- Manager: Colin Mcillwane
- League: NAFL 1A
- 2024–25: NAFL 1A, 9th
- Website: http://albertfoundryfc.co.uk
Home colours	Away colours	Third colours

Albert Foundry Football Club is an intermediate football club from Belfast, Northern Ireland, playing in Division 1A of the Northern Amateur Football League. Its home ground Paisley Park on the West Circular Road. As well as the first team, there is a second team playing in the NAFL Division 3B and an under-18's team playing in the North Down Youth League.

The club was formed as Albert Foundry Colts and elected to the Amateur League in 1981. It soon changed its name to Mountainview Social Club, before becoming West Belfast Rangers in 1988. Another name change to 1st Shankill Northern Ireland Supporters' Club came in 1991, before finally settling on Albert Foundry in 1998.

The Foundry name evokes a former club of the same name, which folded in 1978, having played in the Amateur League since its foundation in 1923, winning the championship in 1960–61.

The club finished runners up in the final of the 2015-2016 Steel and Sons Cup final vs Harland and Wolff Welders

== Honours ==
=== Intermediate honours ===
- Northern Amateur Football League: 1
  - 2006–07
- Clarence Cup: 1
  - 2009–10
- Border Cup: 2
  - 1994–95, 2013–14

=== Junior honours ===
- Irish Junior Cup: 1
  - 1991–92
