= Crumlin United F.C. (Northern Ireland) =

Association football club in Northern Ireland

Crumlin United
- Full name: Crumlin United Football Club
- Founded: 1968
- Ground: Mill Road, Crumlin
- Chairman: Tom McPeake
- Manager: Patrick Kelly
- League: NAFL Division 1A

Crumlin United Football Club is a Northern Irish, intermediate football club playing in Division 1A of the Northern Amateur Football League. The club is based in Crumlin, County Antrim, was founded in 1968 and played in the Lisburn League, Ballymena Premier League and Dunmurry League before joining the Amateur League in 1986. In 1990, intermediate status was achieved.

Crumlin United have several youth teams who play in the South Belfast Youth League.

== Origin ==
Crumlin United was founded by John Henry, Jimmy Wilson and Billy Friars in 1967 when they entered their first team in the Lisburn League Second Division under the name of Ulster Woolen Mills. The aforementioned company provided the team with a pitch for the season. The closure of UWM the following year saw the team disband, only to resurrect itself in June 1968 in the Crumlin British Legion Hall, this time as Crumlin United.

== Honours ==
=== Intermediate honours ===
- Northern Amateur Football League: 1
  - 1994–95
- Border Cup: 1
  - 2000–01
- Clarence Cup: 1
  - 2022–23

=== Junior honours ===
- County Antrim Junior Shield: 1
  - 1985–86
