= Lisburn Rangers F.C. =

Association football club in Northern Ireland

Lisburn Rangers
- Full name: Lisburn Rangers Football Club
- Founded: 1957
- Ground: Stanley Park, Lisburn
- Chairman: William Harbinson
- Manager: Hugh Sinclair
- League: NAFL Premier Division
- 2024-25: NAFL Division 1A, 1st
| Home colours | Away colours |

Lisburn Rangers Football Club is a Northern Irish, intermediate-level association football club based in Lisburn and playing in the Premier Division of the Northern Amateur Football League. The club has been a member of the Amateur League since 1963.

On Saturday 1 August 2009 they opened their new home at Lisburn Leisureplex with a match against Lisburn Distillery. The facilities were named "Stanley Park" after long serving clubman and Club President Stanley Coulter in a ceremony before the match.

Lisburn Rangers' reserve team are playing in Division 3B of the Northern Amateur Football League after being promoted as League Winners in 2010. After obtaining promotion in the 2015 the Reserve team now play in 3B.

== Honours ==
=== Intermediate honours ===
- Clarence Cup: 2
  - 1964–65, 1972–73
- Border Cup: 1
  - 1972–73
- NAFL 1A: 1
  - 2024–25
- Barron Cup
  - 2024-25
