= Drumaness Mills F.C. =

Association football club in Northern Ireland

Drumaness Mills
- Full name: Drumaness Mills Football Club
- Nickname: The Mills
- Founded: 1929
- Ground: Meadowvale, Drumaness
- League: NAFL Premier Division
Home colours	Away colours

Drumaness Mills Football Club is a Northern Irish, intermediate football club based in Drumaness, near Ballynahinch, and playing in the Premier Division of the Northern Amateur Football League.

== History ==
The club, nicknamed "The Mills", was founded in 1929, and took membership of the Northern Amateur Football League (NAFL) Second Division upon their foundation. They left the league in 1941, returned briefly in 1950 then left again before resuming membership in 1954. They have remained in the league ever since.

Their first trophy was the Division 1B Athletics Stores Cup won in the 1960–61 season, but they subsequently won the NAFL four times, four Border Regiment Cups and three Clarence Cups.

Outside of the Amateur League, The Mills most notable success was their progression to the 6th Round of the Irish Cup when they welcomed Ards FC to Meadowvale in 1993: 1992–93 Irish Cup.

The Mills have once more embarked on the 6th round where they await Glentoran.

Drumaness Mills Reserves compete in the Premier Division of The Newcastle and District Amateur Football League.

== Ground ==
Their home ground, Meadowvale, was opened on Saturday, 1 August 1992 with a friendly against Cliftonville. The club recently acquired planning permission to redevelop their home ground with work underway on a new 3G training facility.

== Honours ==
=== Intermediate honours ===
- Northern Amateur Football League: 4
  - 1981–82, 1983–84, 1988–89, 2013–14
- Clarence Cup: 3
  - 1992–93, 1993–94, 2013–14
- Border Cup: 4
  - 1977–78, 1978–79, 1980–81, 1986–87
