= Short Brothers F.C. =

Association football club in Northern Ireland

Short Brothers
- Full name: Short Brothers Football Club
- Nickname: Shorts
- Founded: 1937
- Ground: Aircraft Park, Belfast
- Capacity: 1,000
- Chairman: Darren Orr
- League: NAFL Division 1C
- 2021-22: NAFL Division 1C, 4th

Short Brothers Football Club, often referred to simply as Shorts is a Northern Irish intermediate football club playing in Division 1C of the Northern Amateur Football League. It was formed by Short Brothers aerospace manufacturing company in Belfast with the arrival of the company to the city in the 1930s, making them a works team. The club - originally known as Aircraft Works - joined the Amateur League in 1937 and is the second-oldest member club with continual membership.

Shorts F.C. compete in the Irish Cup.

== Honours ==
=== Intermediate honours ===
- Irish Intermediate Cup: 1
  - 1987–88
- Steel & Sons Cup: 1
  - 1979–80
- Northern Amateur Football League: 5
  - 1956–57, 1957–58, 1958–59, 1959–60, 1989–90
- Clarence Cup: 1
  - 1939–40
- Border Cup: 7
  - 1939–40, 1946–47, 1948–49, 1955–56, 1959–60, 1981–82, 1983–84
