= Islandmagee F.C. =

Association football club in Northern Ireland

Islandmagee
- Full name: Islandmagee Football Club
- Nickname: The Islanders
- Founded: 1955
- Ground: Wilbourne Park, Islandmagee
- Manager: Paul Thompson
- League: NAFL Premier Division
- 2023–24: NAFL Premier Division, 10th
Away colours

Islandmagee Football Club is a Northern Irish intermediate football club from Islandmagee, County Antrim, and playing in the Premier Division of the Northern Amateur Football League. The club plays at Wilbourne Park, Islandmagee. The home strip is red shirts, blue shorts, red socks, while the away strip is royal blue shirts, navy shorts and socks.

== History ==
After formation there was a series of friendly fixtures before joining the Larne and District Junior League in season 1956–57. Then, in the 1957–58 season, their application to join the Northern Amateur Football League was successful. The club's first Amateur League game was in Division 1B on 17 August 1957, when they defeated local rivals Barn United 5–3. Five years later (1962–63), both clubs gained promotion to Division 1A, then the League's premier section. Islandmagee were promoted as runners-up.

The following season (1966–67), they were Border Cup winners, defeating Albert Foundry 1–0 in the final. Three out of the next four years saw the club contest the final only to lose out to RUC, Ards Rangers and Chimney Corner. The club's most successful season was in 1967–68 when, despite losing 3–1 to Chimney Corner in the Border Cup final, they became Division 1A champions with an undefeated run taking 58 points out of a possible 60. This achievement had never been done before and will not be equalled again as the number of teams in the league have been reduced to 14 instead of 16. Relegation in the mid-1970s brought lean times on the playing front, but in 1984–85, they managed to regain their premier section status being promoted to 1A with champions Civil Service. Relegation followed a year later, however, and almost a decade passed before they again put in a meaningful challenge.

In season 1993–94, promotion to the premier section was denied them by Crumlin United in a play-off for runners-up place. 1st Shankill N.I.S.C. defeated them by three goals to one in the 1994–95 Border Cup decider, but a spirited rally in the second half of the season saw the team clinch promotion to the Premier Section as runners-up to Barn United. A year later, they again contested the Border Cup final, this time against Coagh United, who defeated them by four goals to two on penalties after a 3–3 draw. They once again reached the Border Cup final in season 1998–99, but this time they brought silverware to the club for the first time since 1968 when they defeated the much fancied Killyleagh Youth by three goals to one. Season 1999–00 saw Islandmagee relegated to Division 1A, but thanks to new management and virtually a whole new team, the stay below was short lived, as the Islanders bounced straight back up into the Premier section.

The 2003–04 season was certainly the most successful under manager Graham McConnell, with the team reaching the semi-finals of the Border Regiment and Steel & Sons cups, only to be defeated on both occasions by a strong Killyleagh side, which coincidentally knocked the team out of the Irish Cup. This Steel & Sons Cup run was particularly unique as club secretary, Crawford Wilson, was chairman of that very competition. The run in the Steel & Sons presented the club with an opportunity to compete in the last 16 of the County Antrim Shield, where they met Linfield at Windsor Park. Despite holding the Premier League outfit for 57 minutes, the game ended in a 4–0 defeat.

== Honours ==
=== Intermediate honours ===
- Northern Amateur Football League: 1
  - 1967–68
- Clarence Cup: 1
  - 2007–08
- Border Cup: 2
  - 1963–64, 1998–99

== Website ==
An official Islandmagee FC website which opened in 2003 closed in October 2009 after Yahoo GeoCities closed. This was found at www.islandmageefc.vze.com . A new website is planned for the future.
