= Comber Recreation F.C. =

Association football club in Northern Ireland

Comber Recreation
- Full name: Comber Recreation Football Club
- Founded: 1950
- Ground: Park Way, Comber
- Chairman: Gary McKibbin
- Manager: Stephen Gourley
- League: NAFL Premier Division
- 2024–25: NAFL Premier Division, 1st (champions)
Home colours

Comber Recreation Football Club (or more commonly Comber Rec.) is an intermediate, Northern Irish football club based in Comber, playing in the Premier Division of the Northern Amateur Football League. The club was founded in 1950 as Comber Youth Club. Its home ground is located at Parkway in Comber. The team is managed by Stephen Gourley and assisted by Laurence Fyfe and Glen Halliday. In addition to its first XI, Comber also fields 3 reserve teams and multiple youth teams. The 2nd XI currently play in the Amateur League Division 3A while the 3rd XI are in Division 1 of the Down Area Winter Football League. The 4th XI play in the Down Area Winter Football League Reserve divisions.

== History ==
In 1950, the club formed as Comber Youth Club, although it only played friendly matches for its first two seasons. The club then successfully applied to join the Irish Churches' League, affiliating itself to the local Presbyterian church and renaming the club as 1st Comber Presbyterian. It remained there for only a couple of seasons before joining the Northern Amateur Football League in the mid-1950s. At first, club facilities were fairly sparse. The club had to share the grounds at Parkway with Comber Young Men and the changing facilities had little lighting, no water and was heated by a coal-fired stove.

The fortunes of the club were to quickly improve. The 1956–57 season saw them win their trophy when they won the Border Cup. The following season they retained the Border Cup and also won the Clarence Cup. The club has had other cup successes but their most important to date was their victory over Brantwood in the final of the Steel and Sons Cup in 1991–92. They almost claimed the title for a second time when they made it to the final in 1996 but lost to Chimney Corner.

On Thursday 8 November 2012 Comber Rec Ladies was formed by Heather McCracken & Winston Kerr. In their inaugural season in the NIWFA, Comber Rec Ladies finished 3rd in Division 4. 2014 saw Comber Rec Ladies compete in Division 3, with Comber Rec Ladies winning the league title on the last match of the season, with an emphatic 5–0 win over Fermanagh Mallards. Comber Rec Ladies added to their trophy haul by winning back to back League Titles - the NIWFA South 1 title in 2017 and the NIWFA Championship in 2018. Comber Rec Ladies added the Division 1 League Cup in August 2026.

In October 2015 Comber Rec Ladies and Comber Rec Youth were awarded Clubmark NI 1*Star Accreditation having met standards in: Effective Management, Quality Coaching and Competition, Safety in Sport.

Comber Rec won the Steel and Sons Cup in 2023.

== Club honours ==
=== Intermediate honours ===
- NAFL Premier: 1
  - 2024–25
- NAFL 1A: 1
  - 2021–22
- Steel and Sons Cup: 2
  - 1991–92, 2023–24
- Clarence Cup: 3
  - 1957–58, 1961–62, 1998–99
- Border Cup: 3
  - 1956–57, 1957–58, 2024-25
- S M Jefferson Cup
  - 2024-25

=== Junior honours ===
- DAWFL Reserve Division 2: 1
  - 2024–25
- DAWFL Reserve Division 1: 1
  - 2025–26
- Mervyn Bassett Cup: 1
  - 2024–25
- Tommy Murphy Memorial Shield: 1
  - 2025–26
- Frank Moore Memorial Cup: 1
  - 2018-19
- Dennis S Nash Charity Shield: 2
  - 2019-20, 2006-07
- NIWFA Division 3 League Title (Comber Rec Ladies) : 1
  - 2014
- NIWFA South 1 League Title (Comber Rec Ladies) : 1
  - 2017
- NIWFA Championship League Title (Comber Rec Ladies) : 1
  - 2018
- NIWFA Division 1 League Cup Champions (Comber Rec Ladies) : 1
  - 2026
