= Larne Technical Old Boys F.C. =

Association football club in Northern Ireland

Larne Tech Old Boys
- Full name: Larne Technical College Old Boys Association Football Club
- Nicknames: Larne Tech Old Boys, Larne Tech, The Tech, LTOB
- Founded: 30 May 1950
- Ground: Dennis Harvey Park, Larne
- Manager: Stephen King
- League: NAFL Premier Division
Home colours

Larne Technical College Old Boys Association Football Club, commonly known as Larne Tech Old Boys, is a Northern Irish, intermediate football club based in Larne, playing in the Premier Division of the Northern Amateur Football League. The club formed on 30 May 1950 by former pupils of the Larne Technical College. Since 1971, they have played their home matches at Dennis Harvey Park on the Upper Cairncastle Road, Larne. There is also a second team currently playing in the NAFL Division 3A.

== History ==
The club was founded, in 1950, by the then principal of Larne Technical School. The principal, who had been appointed to the role in 1947, hoped to create a club for former pupils of the college. The founder described it as a "natural progression" of the school football team and several of the people who had been former club officers were elected to start the new team.

On 30 May 1950, Larne Technical Old Boys (LTOB) came into being and was accepted into the Northern Amateur Football League Division 2. Within a few years, the club had set up their own facilities and was fielding two teams a week.

However, by the late 1960s membership of the club had dropped and the club was close to bankruptcy. In 1970, they had to give up their clubrooms in order to stay afloat. Soon interest in the club renewed and in 1971 they moved to their current home at Antville Playing Fields (later renamed Dennis Harvey Park in 2009). The team grew and in 1976 they claimed their first Amateur League titles winning both the Border Regiment Cup and Templeton Cup. The pitch was upgraded in 1991 to allow them to compete in the Intermediate section of the NAFL. This was followed by two more Border Cup victories in 1998 and 2002.

As of 2019, LTOB were competing in the Premier Division of the NAFL, finishing the 2018/19 season as champions of Division 1A sealing the first league title in the club's history with a 3–1 final day win against Comber Rec.

== Honours ==
- Northern Amateur Football League Border Regiment Cup: 3
  - 1975–76, 1997–98, 2001–02
- Northern Amateur Football League Division 1A: 1
  - 2018-19
