= 1st Bangor Old Boys F.C. =

Association football club in Northern Ireland

1st Bangor Old Boys
- Full name: 1st Bangor Old Boys Football Club
- Founded: 1967
- Ground: The Drome, Newtownards
- Chairman: Dean Gordan
- Manager: John Johnston & Stuart Killen
- League: NAFL Premier Division

1st Bangor Old Boys Football Club, also known as 1st Bangor O.B., is a Northern Irish, intermediate football club playing in the Premier Division of the Northern Amateur Football League.

A club of the same name was in existence from 1938 to 1965, but the present club was founded in 1967, and joined the Amateur League in 1979, winning the Junior Cup in the same season.

Originally from Bangor, County Down, the club is now based at the Drome in Newtownards.

== Honours ==
=== Junior honours ===
- Irish Junior Cup
  - Winners (1): 1979–80
- County Antrim Junior Shield
  - Winners (2): 1980–81, 1982–83
