= Orangefield Old Boys F.C. =

Association football club in Northern Ireland

Orangefield Old Boys
- Full name: Orangefield Old Boys' Association Football Club
- Founded: 1966
- Ground: Cregagh Sports Club, Belfast
- League: NAFL Division 1C

Orangefield Old Boys is a Northern Irish, intermediate football club playing in Division 1A of the Northern Amateur Football League. The club is based in Belfast, and was formed in 1966 by members of the Orangefield Old Boys' Association, made up of former pupils of Orangefield High School. It shares a ground with Cregagh Cricket Club. The club plays in the Irish CupThe 2021/22 top goal scorer was Owen Getty.
