= Ballynahinch United F.C. =

Association football club in Northern Ireland

Ballynahinch United
- Full name: Ballynahinch United Football Club
- Founded: 1968
- Ground: Millbridge, Ballynahinch
- Manager: None
- League: NAFL Division 1C
- Website: www.ballynahinchunited.com

Ballynahinch United Football Club is a Northern Irish, intermediate football club playing in Division 1C of the Northern Amateur Football League (NAFL). The club is based in Ballynahinch, County Down, and was formed in 1968. As well as the first team, there is a second team (Swifts) playing in the Newcastle and District Association League (NADAFL) Division 1.

The club have had a third team in various years, most recently the 2025-26 season. They are known as Ballynahinch United Albion and would compete in NAFAL divisions.

== Club history ==
The club formed in 1968 and originally played in the Newcastle and District League. After winning a number of league titles and the Harry Clark Cup, United moved to the Northern Amateur Football League in the 1970s and have remained ever since.

Ballynahinch United's first Northern Amateur Football League game was a 3–0 win vs Linfield Rangers in 1973–74 under manager Billy Hamilton. Clifford Adams, Graham Hamilton and George Hayes were the goal scorers on the day. The club were promoted from NAFL Division 2B as runners-up to Courtaulds that same year. In the same season they reached the IFA Irish Junior Cup final, but lost to Moyola Park.

In 197576, the team were NAFL Division 2A Champions under Billy Hamilton.

In the early 1990s, the club gained promotion to Division 1A but were unable to maintain the status.

They have also had cup success in the Border Cup (1988–89) and Clarence Cup (1996–97).

=== Border Regiment Cup Win ===
On 27 December 1989, Ballynahinch United reached the pinnacle of Amateur League Football in Northern Ireland by defeating 1A giants British Telecoms in the Border Regiment Cup Final at Wilgar Park.

Trevor Tate gave the underdogs the lead with a blistering free kick from 25 yards in the first half. They fell behind after BT fought back to go 2–1 ahead. But Mark Hughes forced the game into extra time and penalties after scoring from the spot when Club Stalwart Brian Mckibben had been upended.

The two teams couldn't be separated in extra time and the final went to penalties. John Leonard proved to be the hero of the hour and saved British Telecom's first and fourth penalties.

Player, Manager and Captain, Brian McKibben scored his spot kick to defeat the 1A Giants and send the revered Border Cup to Ballynahinch for the first time.

The Champions took an open topped lorry tour of Ballynahinch to show off the silverware adorned in glorious sky blue ribbons.

Chairman: Bobby Reid

The team included: David Dunlop, Mark Hughes, Kieran McGrady, John Leonard (Goalkeeper), Alan Brown, Paddy McCartan, Trevor Tate, Campbell Allen. Andy Cross, David Crainey, Brian McKibbin (Player Manager), Wilson Hamilton, Norman McCullough, Alan Carson.

=== Clarence Mayes Cup ===
In 1996–97 Michael Savage led Ballynahinch United to the final of the Clarence Cup but they were defeat 4–0 by Knockbreda Parish FC. It was later revealed that Knockbreda had fielded an ineligible player and the trophy was awarded to Ballynahinch.

== Honours ==
=== Intermediate honours ===
- Clarence Cup: 1
  - 1996–97
- Border Cup: 1
  - 1989–90

=== Other honours ===
==== United ====
===== Leagues =====
- Northern Amateur Football League Division 1B
  - Runners Up: 1995–96
- Northern Amateur Football League Division 2A
  - Champions: 1975–76
- Northern Amateur Football League Division 2B
  - Runners Up: 1973–74
- Newcastle and District League Division 1
  - Champions: 1971–72, 1972–73
- Newcastle and District League Division 2
  - Runners Up: 1970–71
- Kilmore and District Summer League
  - Champions: 1969–70

===== Cups =====
- Clarence Mayes Cup (Northern Amateur Football League)
  - Winners: 1996–97
- Border Regiment Cup (Northern Amateur Football League)
  - Winners: 1989–90
- Cochrane Corry Cup (County Antrim Football Association)
  - Runners Up: 1982–83
- Junior Cup (Irish Football Association)
  - Runners Up: 1973–74, 1979–80
- Harry Clarke Cup (Newcastle and District League)
  - Runners Up: 1972–73
- Enterprise Cup (Newcastle and District League)
  - Winners: 1970–71

==== Swifts ====
===== Leagues =====
- Northern Amateur Football League Division 3D
  - Runners Up: 2007–08
- Northern Amateur Football League Division 3E
  - Runners Up: 2006–07
- Newcastle and District League Division 2
  - Champions: 1972–73, 2005–06

===== Cups =====
- Division 2 League Cup (Newcastle and District League)
  - Winners: 1972–73
- Harry Clarke Cup (Newcastle and District League)
  - Runners Up: 1979–80
- Purdy Cup (Newcastle and District League)
  - Runners up: 1996-97, 2002–03

==== Albion ====
===== Leagues =====
- Newcastle and District League Division 2
  - Champions: 2008–09
  - Runners Up: 1996–97

===== Cups =====
- Donard Dairy Shield (Newcastle and District League)
  - Winners: 1996–97
- Bignian Cup (Newcastle and District League)
  - Winners: 2008–09
