= Nortel F.C. =

Association football club in Northern Ireland

Nortel
- Full name: Nortel Football Club
- Founded: 1964 (as Standard Telephones & Cables)
- Ground: Monkstown Avenue, Newtownabbey
- Chairman: Alan Beggs
- Manager: Lee McCartney
- League: Northern Amateur Football League Premier Division
- 2015–16: Northern Amateur Football League Premier Division, 7th
Away colours

Nortel Football Club are a Northern Irish football club, based in Monkstown, Newtownabbey and playing latterly in the Premier Division of the Northern Amateur Football League (NAFL). The club withdrew from the league in 2016 but returned to Division 2C for the following season.

== History ==
The club was formed as Standard Telephones & Cables (S.T.C.) in 1964 by workers in the company's factory in Monkstown. The factory had only recently opened and the workers decided to form a team which they could enter in the junior ranks of Northern Irish football. In the early 1970s however the club experienced growth and, after winning the Division 2A title, were promoted to the intermediate tier. This occurred in 1970 and marked the beginning of a decade of growth for the club. The 1973–74 season saw them win promotion to the top tier of the league and they competed the double that year by winning the Clarence Cup, a knockout tournament for Amateur League sides. The club were relegated to Division 1B in 1980–81 but kept faith in long-serving manager Barry McClung who led them to immediate promotion before in 1982–83 winning the overall Amateur League title, as well as victory in the Border Cup (a knockout competition for First Division teams only) and a semi-final place in the Steel & Sons Cup. However McClung left in late 1984 with former Crusaders F.C. goalkeeper Roy McDonald taking over as manager.

The name changed to Northern Telecom in 1991 when S.T.C. was acquired by the Canadian company of the same name and then again to its current name in 2001. As Northern Telecom the club would twice more be crowned Amateur League champions, winning the title in 1995-96 and retaining it the following season. The club's current facilities at Monkstown Avenue were opened in 1980. The club announced their withdrawal from football in October 2016. However they returned to NAFL membership for the 2017–18 season, albeit in the junior Division 2C.

== Honours ==
=== Intermediate honours ===
- Northern Amateur Football League: 3
  - 1982–83, 1995–96, 1996–97
- Clarence Cup: 2
  - 1973–74, 1985–86
- Border Cup: 4
  - 1982–83, 1985–86, 1990–91, 1999–00
