= Killyleagh Youth F.C. =

Association football club in Northern Ireland

Killyleagh Youth
- Full name: Killyleagh Youth Football Club
- Nickname: The Whites
- Founded: 1960
- Ground: The Showgrounds, Killyleagh
- Chairman: Dawn Murray
- Manager: vacant
- League: NAFL 1B
- 2022–23: NAFL 1B, 5
Away colours

Killyleagh Youth Football Club (also known as Killyleagh YC) is a Northern Irish, intermediate-level football club based in Killyleagh, near Downpatrick, playing in the Premier Division of the Northern Amateur Football League. The club was formed in 1960, playing in the South Belfast Youth League for one season before joining the Amateur League in 1961. Intermediate status was achieved in 1963. They play their home matches at the Showgrounds in Killyleagh. Perhaps their biggest achievement of recent times was when they reached the semi-final of the Irish Cup in 2002, losing 4–0 to Linfield. . They became the first team in the modern era to win the Amateur League's Premier Section title for six consecutive seasons (1999 and 2005), under the managership of Dee Heron.

== Honours ==
=== Intermediate honours ===
- Steel & Sons Cup: 1
  - 2002–03
- Northern Amateur Football League: 8
  - 1984–85, 1992–93, 1999–00, 2000–01, 2001–02, 2002–03, 2003–04, 2004–05
- Clarence Cup: 3
  - 1997–98, 2000–01, 2001–02
- Border Cup: 4
  - 1984–85, 1996–97, 2002–03, 2003–04
