= Down Area Winter Football League =

Association football league in Northern Ireland

The Down Area Winter Football League (DAWFL), is an amateur association football league in County Down, Northern Ireland. The league was formed in August 1974 in Downpatrick, and currently has over 50 clubs affiliated with it. The league runs a winter season from September to May. Teams compete in a number of divisions, as well as cup competitions.

A number of players within the league have gone on to play professionally. These include Northern Ireland internationals, such as Steven Davis and Keith Gillespie. NIFL teams submit their reserve teams to the league.

== League format ==
The league is divided into divisions, with relegation and promotion. The league structure is as follows:

- Premier Division
- Division 1
- Division 2
- Reserve Division 1
- Reserve Division 2

== Cup tournaments ==
- Billy Allen Memorial Shield
- Dennis Nash Charity Shield
- Sittlington Cup
- Frank Moore Cup
- Mervyn Bassett Cup
- Tommy Murphy Memorial Shield

== List of DAWFL teams for 2025/26 ==
=== Premier Division ===
- Ards Rangers Colts
- Ballynafeigh Breda Star
- Blackstaff
- Castle Juniors
- Comber Rec III
- Comber YM
- Corrymeela
- Millisle
- Newtownards RBL
- North Down
- Victoria Athletic
- Vision Athletic

=== Division 1 ===
- 43rd Dundonald
- Abbey Villa Development Team
- Ballygowan
- Ballyhalbert United
- Bangor YM III
- Bloomfield III
- Cooke Athletic
- Holywood III
- Lagan Swifts
- Newtown Forest
- Willowfield Parish 10th OB

=== Division 2 ===
- 3rd Bangor
- Bryansburn Rangers III
- Carryduff Colts III
- Clarawood
- Cloughey FC
- East Belfast III
- Groomsport III
- Queens Grads III
- Ravenhill YM II
- Tullycarnet III

=== Reserve 1 ===
- 43rd Dundonald II
- Castle Juniors II
- Comber Rec IV
- Comber YM II
- Holywood IV
- Newtown Forest II
- Newtownards RBL II
- North Down II
- Victoria Athletic II
- Vision Athletic II
- Willowfield Parish 10th OB Athletic

=== Reserve 2 ===
- 3rd Bangor II
- Ards Rangers Swifts
- Ballygowan II
- Ballynafeigh Breda Star II
- Blackstaff II
- Bryansburn Rangers IV
- Carryduff Colts IV
- Cloughey FC II
- Corrymeela II
- Lagan Swifts II
- Millisle II
- Queens Grads IV
