= County Antrim & District F.A. =

Football association in Northern Ireland

The County Antrim & District Football Association (also known as the North East Ulster Football Association but more commonly as the County Antrim FA) is the largest of the four regional football associations within Northern Ireland and affiliated to the Irish FA, the others being the Mid-Ulster FA, the North-West of Ireland FA and the Fermanagh & Western FA.

== History ==
The County Antrim FA held its inaugural meeting on 23 April 1888 at the Commercial Hotel, Donegall Street, Belfast. The founding seven member clubs were Belfast Athletics, Cliftonville, Clarence, Distillery, YMCA, Oldpark and Whiteabbey. Ballyclare, Linfield Athletics, Mountcollyer and Beechmount joined these clubs shortly thereafter. In the intervening years, membership has grown from these eleven clubs to more than 500. In 1896, the jurisdiction of the Association was extended beyond County Antrim to include all clubs within the Parliamentary boundaries of Belfast, thus including some within County Down.

Aided by a grant from the Irish FA, the County Antrim FA set about organising a competition for its members, the County Antrim Senior Challenge Shield, for which the first round draw was made in November 1888. Also organised were a fundraising match, held between Cliftonville and "The Rest", and a first representative fixture, lost 6-2 to a touring side from Canada. In the first few years of its existence County Antrim FA XIs also faced teams representing County Londonderry, Mid-Ulster and the Irish FA.

Continued expansion of football in the region permitted the County Antrim FA to found further competitions, the Steel & Sons Cup in 1895 and the County Antrim Junior Shield in 1900. Regular representative fixtures continued until the 1950s when financial losses incurred on trips to face the Sheffield and Hallamshire FA proved too much for the Association to bear.

In 1988, to celebrate the County Antrim FA's centenary a special competition was organised - The County Antrim FA Centenary Chalice. The specially produced crystal trophy was won by Glentoran who defeated Ballymena United 4-2 in the final at Windsor Park, Belfast. That same season a County Antrim Select lost 6-2 to a Combined Mid-Ulster/North-West Select in a commemorative match at Windsor Park.

== Today ==
The County Antrim FA now has over 500 member clubs, spread beyond the traditional boundaries of County Antrim into mid-, north and east County Down. Membership comes from all levels of football within Northern Ireland, from the senior, intermediate, junior and youth leagues and includes the reserve teams of many NIFL Premiership clubs.

== Competitions ==
- Senior Shield (founded 1888) - Open to senior and selected intermediate teams (usually based on performances in the previous season's Steel Cup).
- Steel & Sons Cup (founded 1895) - Open to intermediate teams only, including senior clubs' reserve teams.
- Junior Shield (founded 1900) - Open to junior teams only
- Centenary Chalice (one-off competition held in 1988) - Open to senior and selected intermediate teams.
- Women's Challenge Cup (founded 2013)

== Representative Matches ==
Selected representative matches played by County Antrim FA Selects.

Date	Venue	Opponent	Result	Notes
01 Sept 1888	Shaftesbury Grounds, Ormeau Road, Belfast	Canada	2-6	Canadian side selected by the Western FA
14 Oct 1953	Solitude, Belfast	South Africa	1-0	
10 May 1988	Windsor Park, Belfast	Mid-Ulster/North-West Select	2-6	County Antrim FA Centenary game

== Chairmen & Presidents ==
=== Chairmen ===
- 1888-1898 (office not in existence)
- 1912-1916 G.D. Jenkins
- 1912-1916 R. Ervine
- 1916-1943 J.M. Small
- 1943-1966 F.J. Cochrane (also Irish FA President 1948-1957)
- 1966-1967 T. Moorhead
- 1967-1985 W. Carlisle
- Designation of post changed to president in 1985

=== Presidents ===
- 1985-1989 H.A Johnstone
- 1989-1991 D. Crawford
- 1991-1993 J. Boyce (also Irish FA President 1995-2007)
- 1993-1995 B.K. McGaughey
- 1995-1997 G.F.W. McIlwrath
- 1997-1999 T.E. Pateman
- 1999-2000 B.H. Dunlop
- 2001-2004 S.J. Shaw
- 2004-2006 F.G. Magee
- 2006-2008 B. Reid
- 2008-2010 J.T. Hamilton
- 2010-2012 R. Haworth
- 2012-date C. Wilson
