= 2018–19 Irish Cup =

Tournament details
- Country: Northern Ireland
- Teams: 126

Final positions
- Champions: Crusaders (4th win)
- Runners-up: Ballinamallard United

Tournament statistics
- Matches played: 123
- Goals scored: 530 (4.31 per match)

The 2018–19 Irish Cup (known as the Tennent's Irish Cup for sponsorship purposes) was the 139th edition of the Irish Cup, the premier knockout cup competition in Northern Irish football. The competition began on 11 August 2018 and concluded with the final at Windsor Park on 4 May 2019.

Coleraine were the defending champions, having defeated Cliftonville in the 2018 final. Crusaders were the eventual winners, defeating second-tier side Ballinamallard United 3–0 in the final to lift the Cup for the fourth time overall, and the first time in the 10 years since winning the 2009 final.

== Format and schedule ==
All ties level after 90 minutes used extra time to determine the winner, with a penalty shoot-out to follow if necessary.

126 clubs entered this season's competition – a reduction of four clubs compared with the 2017–18 total of 130 clubs. 90 regional league clubs from tiers 4–7 in the Northern Ireland football league system entered the competition in the first round, with 76 of them drawn into 38 first round fixtures and the remaining 14 clubs receiving a bye into the second round. The 38 first-round winners were joined by the 14 byes and the 12 clubs of the NIFL Premier Intermediate League in the second round. After two further rounds, the eight surviving clubs joined the 24 senior NIFL Premiership and NIFL Championship clubs in the fifth round. All ties level after 90 minutes used extra time to determine the winner, with a penalty shoot-out to follow if necessary.

Round	First match date	Fixtures	Clubs
First round	11 August 2018	38	126 → 88
Second round	28 September 2018	32	88 → 56
Third round	3 November 2018	16	56 → 40
Fourth round	1 December 2018	8	40 → 32
Fifth round	5 January 2019	16	32 → 16
Sixth round	2 February 2019	8	16 → 8
Quarter-finals	1 March 2019	4	8 → 4
Semi-finals	30 March 2019	2	4 → 2
Final	4 May 2019	1	2 → 1

Tiers	Leagues	No. of Entries	Entry round
1	NIFL Premiership	24	Fifth round
2	NIFL Championship	24	Fifth round
3	NIFL Premier Intermediate League	12	Second round
4	Ballymena & Provincial Football League Premier Division; Mid-Ulster Football League Intermediate A Northern Amateur Football League Premier Division; Northern Ireland Intermediate League	90	First round, or Second round if byed
5	Mid-Ulster Football League Intermediate B Northern Amateur Football League Division 1A	90	First round, or Second round if byed
6	Northern Amateur Football League Division 1B	90	First round, or Second round if byed
7	Northern Amateur Football League Division 1C	90	First round, or Second round if byed

== Results ==
=== First round ===
Ties played on 11 and 18 August 2018.

- Valley Rangers 3–2 Tandragee Rovers
- Albert Foundry 4–3 Aquinas
- Ardstraw 7–0 Dromore Amateurs
- Ballymacash Rangers 1–3 Kilmore Recreation
- Ballynahinch United 3–2 Groomsport
- Banbridge Rangers 2–0 Sirocco Works
- Bangor Amateurs 3–2 Newcastle
- Brantwood 4–2 Orangefield Old Boys
- Broomhedge Maghaberry 1–12 Ballynahinch Olympic
- Comber Recreation 1–0 Immaculata
- Cookstown Youth 1–6 Islandmagee
- Crumlin United 2–1 Bangor Swifts
- Desertmartin 2–2 Ballynure Old Boys (Desertmartin won 7–6 on pens)
- Dungiven Celtic 5–2 Iveagh United
- Dunloy 2–0 Hanover
- Dunmurry Young Men 4–5 Rathfriland Rangers
- Fivemiletown United 7–0 Bloomfield
- Glebe Rangers 1–2 Bangor
- Grove United 5–2 Chimney Corner
- Holywood 1–2 Newbuildings United
- Killyleagh YC 5–3 Markethill Swifts
- Lisburn Rangers 2–1 Dromara Village
- Lower Maze 2–3 Trojans
- Malachians 2–9 Maiden City
- Mossley 3–4 Dunmurry Rec.
- Newtowne 6–3 18th Newtownabbey Old Boys
- Oxford Sunnyside 6–3 Bryansburn Rangers
- Oxford United Stars 0–1 Wakehurst
- Rosario YC 1–2 Ballymoney United
- Saintfield United 1–3 Laurelvale
- Seapatrick 1–6 Coagh United
- Silverwood 1–8 Shorts
- St James' Swifts 2–1 Sofia Farmer
- St Luke's 0–2 Larne Tech Old Boys
- Strabane Athletic 2–1 Derriaghy Cricket Club
- Suffolk 1–1 Colin Valley (Colin Valley won 4–3 on pens)
- Tullycarnet 4–3 Tullyvallen
- Woodvale 2–3 St Patrick's Young Men

=== Second round ===
The twelve members of the NIFL Premier Intermediate League joined the competition at this stage as well as the first-round winners and byes.

Ties played on Saturday 29 September 2018.

- Newington 3–1 Valley Rangers (played on Friday 28 September)
- Ballymoney United 1–5 Strabane Athletic
- Banbridge Town 3–1 Rathfriland Rangers
- Bangor 2–0 Banbridge Rangers
- Bangor Amateurs 0–1 Tullycarnet
- Brantwood 2–1 Laurelvale
- Colin Valley 3–4 Shorts
- Comber Rec 4–1 Lisburn Rangers
- Crewe United 2–1 Moyola Park
- Crumlin United 5–1 Moneyslane
- Downshire Young Men 0–4 Drumaness Mills
- Dundonald 0–3 Larne Tech Old Boys
- Dunloy 2–0 Armagh City
- Dunmurry Rec. 1–4 Dungiven Celtic
- Grove United 3–4 Abbey Villa (aet)
- Islandmagee 2–1 Albert Foundry
- Killyleagh YC 2–3 Crumlin Star
- Kilmore Recreation 1–2 Sport & Leisure Swifts
- Lisburn Distillery 2–0 Wellington Recreation
- Lurgan Celtic v St Patrick's Young Men (Lurgan Celtic received bye)
- Lurgan Town 4–1 Desertmartin
- Maiden City 3–1 Trojans
- Newbuildings United 2–0 Ards Rangers
- Newtowne 0–0 Ballynahinch Olympic (Newtowne won 5–3 on pens)
- Oxford Sunnyside v Portstewart (Portstewart received bye)
- Queen's University 4–3 Dollingstown
- Rosemount Recreation 2–1 Annagh United
- Seagoe 4–3 Ballynahinch United
- Shankill United 2–1 1st Bangor Old Boys
- St. James' Swifts 4–2 Coagh United
- Tobermore United 5–3 Ardstraw
- Wakehurst 2–3 Fivemiletown United

=== Third round ===
Ties were played Saturday 3 November 2018.

- Crewe United 1–0 Sport & Leisure Swifts
- Crumlin Star 5–3 Bangor
- Crumlin United 1–3 Islandmagee
- Drumaness Mills 1–2 Comber Recreation
- Fivemiletown United 1–2 Tullycarnet
- Larne Tech Old Boys 2–1 Dungiven Celtic
- Lurgan Celtic 2–3 Portstewart
- Lurgan Town 1–2 Dunloy
- Newtowne 1–1 Rosemount Recreation (Rosemount Recreation won 5–3 on penalties)
- Queen's University 6–3 Tobermore United
- Seagoe 1–4 Maiden City
- Shankill United 2–4 Lisburn Distillery
- Shorts 1–3 Abbey Villa
- St James' Swifts 2–0 Newbuildings United
- Strabane Athletic 2–0 Banbridge Town
- Brantwood 2–3 Newington

=== Fourth round ===
Ties were played on Saturday 1 December 2018.

- Crewe United 1–2 Crumlin Star
- Dunloy 0–2 Larne Tech Old Boys
- Lisburn Distillery 4–3 Comber Recreation
- Maiden City 1–0 Portstewart
- Queen's University 4–1 Newington
- Rosemount Recreation 3–1 Islandmagee
- Strabane Athletic 2–0 St James' Swifts
- Tullycarnet 3–4 Abbey Villa

=== Fifth round ===
Ties were played on Saturday 5 January 2019.

Team 1	Score	Team 2
Ards	0–1	Carrick Rangers
Ballinamallard United	5–1	PSNI
Cliftonville	0–1	Dungannon Swifts
Coleraine	2–0	Harland & Wolff Welders
Crusaders	4–1	Glentoran
Dergview	3–2	Maiden City
Dundela	1–3	Ballymena United
Glenavon	5–0	Rosemount Recreation
Institute	0–2	Warrenpoint Town
Knockbreda	1–2	Strabane Athletic
Larne	2–1	Newry City
Limavady United	0–2	Larne Tech Old Boys
Linfield	1–0	Ballyclare Comrades
Loughgall	1–4	Crumlin Star
Portadown	5–1	Abbey Villa
Queen's University	6–0	Lisburn Distillery

=== Sixth round ===
Four ties were played on 2 February 2019, with four ties postponed to 11 February.

Team 1	Score	Team 2
Ballinamallard United	1–0	Carrick Rangers
Ballymena United	4–1	Portadown
Coleraine	3–0	Dergview
Glenavon	0–1	Dungannon Swifts
Larne	3–1	Crumlin Star
Larne Tech Old Boys	3–1	Strabane Athletic
Linfield	1–2	Crusaders
Warrenpoint Town	2–0	Queen's University

=== Quarter-finals ===
Ties were played on 1 and 2 March 2019.

Team 1	Score	Team 2
Larne	3–5 (a.e.t.)	Coleraine
Crusaders	3–0	Ballymena United
Dungannon Swifts	2–2 (a.e.t.) (2–3 p)	Ballinamallard United
Warrenpoint Town	3–1	Larne Tech Old Boys

=== Semi-finals ===
Ties were played on 30 March 2019.

Team 1	Score	Team 2
Ballinamallard United	0–0 (a.e.t.) (5–4 p)	Warrenpoint Town
Coleraine	0–2	Crusaders

=== Final ===
The final was played on 4 May 2019.

4 May 2019
14:30 BST (GMT+1)

Crusaders	3–0	Ballinamallard United
Owens 6'; Lowry 47'; Clarke 53'	Report

Windsor Park, Belfast
Attendance: 5,744
