= 2017–18 Irish Cup =

Tournament details
- Country: Northern Ireland
- Teams: 130

Final positions
- Champions: Coleraine (6th win)
- Runners-up: Cliftonville

Tournament statistics
- Matches played: 125
- Goals scored: 577 (4.62 per match)

The 2017–18 Irish Cup (known as the Tennent's Irish Cup for sponsorship purposes) was the 138th edition of the Irish Cup, the premier knockout cup competition in Northern Irish football since its introduction in 1881. The competition began on 19 August 2017 and concluded with the final at Windsor Park in May 2018.

Linfield are the defending champions, having defeated Coleraine 3–0 in the 2017 final.

A new system for penalty shoot-outs will be trialled as sanctioned by the International Football Association Board to test a different sequence of taking penalties. Known as "ABBA", it mirrors the serving sequence in a tennis tie-break i.e. team A takes the first penalty, team B takes the second penalty, team B takes the third penalty, etc.

== Format and schedule ==
All ties level after 90 minutes used extra time to determine the winner, with a penalty shoot-out to follow if necessary.

130 clubs entered this season's competition, an increase of four clubs compared with the 2016–17 total of 126 clubs. 94 regional league clubs from tiers 4–7 in the Northern Ireland football league system entered the competition in the first round, 12 of whom received a bye into the Round 2A. (Strabane Athletic were originally excluded, but were reinstated after the first-round draw had been made, necessitating a further draw for 'Round 2A' between Strabane and the eleven clubs that had received a first-round bye, with one tie drawn and ten further byes.). The 41 first-round winners were joined by winner and the ten byes from Round 2A and the 12 clubs of the NIFL Premier Intermediate League in the second round. After two further rounds, with the eight surviving clubs joining the 24 senior NIFL Premiership and NIFL Championship clubs in the fifth round. All ties level after 90 minutes used extra time to determine the winner, with a penalty shoot-out to follow if necessary.

Round	Draw date	First match date	Fixtures	Clubs
First round		19 August 2017	41	130 → 89
Round 2A		23 September 2017	1	89 → 88
Second round		30 September 2017	32	88 → 56
Third round		4 November 2017	16	56 → 40
Fourth round		2 December 2017	8	40 → 32
Fifth round		6 January 2018	16	32 → 16
Sixth round		3 February 2018	8	16 → 8
Quarter-finals		3 March 2018	4	8 → 4
Semi-finals		31 March 2018	2	4 → 2
Final		5 May 2018	1	2 → 1

Tiers	Leagues	No. of Entries	Entry round
1	NIFL Premiership	24	Fifth round
2	NIFL Championship	24	Fifth round
3	NIFL Premier Intermediate League	12	Second round
4	Ballymena & Provincial Football League Premier Division; Mid-Ulster Football League Intermediate A Northern Amateur Football League Premier Division; Northern Ireland Intermediate League	94	First round, Round 2A or Second round if byed
5	Mid-Ulster Football League Intermediate B Northern Amateur Football League Division 1A	94	First round, Round 2A or Second round if byed
6	Northern Amateur Football League Division 1B	94	First round, Round 2A or Second round if byed
7	Northern Amateur Football League Division 1C	94	First round, Round 2A or Second round if byed

== Results ==
=== First round ===
Matches were played on 19 August 2017

- 1st Bangor Old Boys 2–3 Tullyvallen
- 18th Newtownabbey Old Boys 3–2 Comber Recreation
- Abbey Villa 0–3 Immaculata
- Ardstraw 10–2 Richhill
- Ballymacash Rangers 3–4 Shankill United
- Ballynahinch United v Rosario YC (Rosario YC received bye)
- Bangor Amateurs 0–3 Newtowne
- Barn United 3–8 Rathfriland Rangers
- Bloomfield 1–3 Craigavon City
- Bryansburn Rangers 3–1 St. Mary's Youth
- Coagh United 6–1 Ballymoney United
- Crewe United 2–3 Drumaness Mills
- Crumlin Star 9–1 Shorts
- Crumlin United 3–2 Silverwood
- Derriaghy Cricket Club 3–1 Bourneview Young Men
- Dollingstown 1–3 Maiden City
- Dunloy 3–1 Banbridge Rangers
- Dunmurry Rec. 4–0 Dromore Amateurs
- Fivemiletown United 1–4 Islandmagee
- Glebe Rangers 2–0 Bangor
- Hanover 8–2 Chimney Corner
- Killyleagh YC 5–1 Newbuildings United
- Laurelvale 6–1 Broomhedge Maghaberry
- Lower Maze 1–2 St. Patrick's Young Men
- Lurgan Town 3–1 Groomsport
- Magherafelt Sky Blues v Colin Valley (Colin Valley received bye)
- Malachians v Downshire Young Men (Downshire Young Men received bye)
- Markethill Swifts 2–1 Grove United
- Moneyslane 1–4 Sirocco Works
- Orangefield Old Boys 3–0 Dunmurry Young Men
- Oxford United Stars 4–3 Trojans
- Portaferry Rovers 3–1 Ballynahinch Olympic
- Rathfern Rangers 4–5 Lisburn Rangers
- Rosemount Rec 3–1 St. Luke's
- Royal British Legion 1–2 Dromara Village
- Saintfield United 2–4 Tandragee Rovers
- Seagoe 1–12 Larne Tech Old Boys
- Seapatrick 1–4 Ballynure Old Boys
- Suffolk 2–3 Dungiven Celtic
- Valley Rangers 5–0 Oxford Sunnyside
- Windmill Stars 2–1 St. James' Swifts

=== Round 2A ===
Strabane Athletic were originally excluded from the competition, but were reinstated after the first-round draw had been made, necessitating a 'Round 2A' involving Strabane and the eleven clubs that had received first-round byes. One tie drawn was drawn and the following ten teams received further byes: Albert Foundry, Ballywalter Rec., Brantwood, Cookstown Youth, Desertmartin, Mossley, Newcastle, Strabane Athletic, UUJ and Wellington Rec.

Match played on 23 September 2017

- Ards Rangers 9–0 Iveagh United

=== Second round ===
The twelve members of the NIFL Premier Intermediate League join the competition at this stage as well as the first-round winners, and the winners and byes from Round 2A.

Matches were played on 30 September 2017

- 18th Newtownabbey Old Boys 1–2 UUJ
- Annagh United 4–2 Markethill Swifts
- Ardstraw 2–6 Dundela
- Armagh City 2–0 Coagh United
- Ballywalter Recreation 6–3 Ballynure Old Boys
- Bryansburn Rangers 3–4 Albert Foundry
- Colin Valley 1–4 Valley Rangers
- Cookstown Youth 6–7 Craigavon City
- Crumlin Star 5–0 Oxford United Stars
- Crumlin United 2–0 Donegal Celtic
- Derriaghy Cricket Club 1–2 Shankill United
- Downshire Young Men 1–10 Moyola Park
- Dromara Village 0–1 Banbridge Town
- Drumaness Mills 0–2 Hanover
- Dunloy 1–2 Portstewart
- Dunmurry Rec. 0–7 Tobermore United
- Glebe Rangers 3–0 Rosemount Recreation
- Immaculata 2–1 Larne Tech Old Boys
- Islandmagee 1–2 Ards Rangers
- Killyleagh YC 2–0 Sirocco Works
- Laurelvale 5–2 Tullyvallen
- Maiden City 7–1 Lurgan Town
- Newcastle 3–1 Strabane Athletic
- Newington 0–3 Lisburn Distillery
- Newtowne 4–2 Desertmartin
- Portaferry Rovers 2–0 Mossley
- Queen's University 7–2 Dungiven Celtic
- Rathfriland Rangers 4–1 Orangefield Old Boys
- Rosario YC 4–0 Brantwood
- Sport & Leisure Swifts 2–0 Windmill Stars
- St Patrick's YM 3–2 Wellington Recreation
- Tandragee Rovers 3–2 Lisburn Rangers

=== Third round ===
Matches were played on 4 November 2017

- Armagh City 1–2 Crumlin Star
- Ballywalter Recreation 3–2 Ards Rangers
- Banbridge Town 1–2 Queen's University
- Craigavon City 1–4 Albert Foundry
- Crumlin United 2–0 Valley Rangers
- Glebe Rangers v UUJ (Glebe Rangers received a bye)
- Hanover 2–3 Shankill United
- Immaculata 3–1 Brantwood (aet)
- Killyleagh YC 3–1 Tobermore United
- Laurelvale 0–5 Moyola Park
- Newcastle 3–0 Rathfriland Rangers
- Newtowne 0–2 Lisburn Distillery
- Portstewart 2–1 Portaferry Rovers
- Sport & Leisure Swifts 0–2 Dundela
- St Patrick's Young Men 2–5 Annagh United
- Tandragee Rovers 1–2 Maiden City (aet)

=== Fourth round ===
Matches were played on 2 December 2017

- Crumlin United 2–4 Immaculata
- Dundela 5–0 Newcastle
- Glebe Rangers 2–1 Annagh United
- Lisburn Distillery 3–1 Albert Foundry
- Moyola Park 2–0 Ballywalter Recreation
- Portstewart 1–1 Maiden City (Maiden City won 3–1 on pens)
- Queen's University 3–1 Killyleagh YC
- Shankill United 0–4 Crumlin Star

=== Fifth round ===
Matches were played on 6 January 2018

Team 1	Score	Team 2
Knockbreda	0–2	Institute
Queen's University	0–1	Dundela
Lurgan Celtic	1–2	Glentoran
Larne	3–0	Dergview
Carrick Rangers	1–3 (a.e.t.)	Glenavon
Coleraine	7–0	Lisburn Distillery
Crusaders	2–0	Maiden City
Ballinamallard United	4–2	Immaculata
Cliftonville	4–3 (a.e.t.)	Warrenpoint Town
Loughgall	4–1	PSNI
Ballymena United	4–0	Moyola Park
Newry City	2–0	Harland & Wolff Welders
Portadown	1–2 (a.e.t.)	Ballyclare Comrades
Ards	4–1	Crumlin Star
Linfield	5–0	Glebe Rangers
Dungannon Swifts	4–0	Limavady United

=== Sixth round ===
Matches were played on 3 February 2018

Team 1	Score	Team 2
Linfield (1)	1–0	Newry City (2)
Cliftonville (1)	4–1	Crusaders (1)
Loughgall (2)	2–1	Ards (1)
Ballyclare Comrades (2)	0–4	Glentoran (1)
Coleraine (1)	4–0	Institute (2)
Ballymena United (1)	2–2 (a.e.t.) (4–3 p)	Ballinamallard United (1)
Larne (2)	6–1	Dundela (3)
Glenavon (1)	3–0	Dungannon Swifts (1)

=== Quarter-finals ===
Matches were due to be played on 3 March 2018 but only the Glenavon/Loughgall fixture was completed on this date. The three remaining fixtures were played on 13 March 2018.

Team 1	Score	Team 2
Ballymena United (1)	1–2	Larne (2)
Coleraine (1)	1–0	Glentoran (1)
Glenavon (1)	1–2	Loughgall (2)
Linfield (1)	0–1	Cliftonville (1)

=== Semi-finals ===
Matches were played on 31 March 2018. Cliftonville played Loughgall at the Oval, and Coleraine played Larne at Ballymena Showgrounds.

Team 1	Score	Team 2
Cliftonville (1)	4–1	Loughgall (2)
Coleraine (1)	3–1	Larne (2)

=== Final ===
The final was played on 5 May 2018 at the National Football Stadium at Windsor Park.

5 May 2018
14:30 BST (GMT+1)

Coleraine	3–1	Cliftonville
McCauley 50'; Burns 78'; Bradley 90+4'	Report	Donnelly 55'

Windsor Park, Belfast
Attendance: 12,012
