= 2005–06 Irish Cup =

Tournament details
- Country: Northern Ireland
- Teams: 101

Final positions
- Champions: Linfield (37th win)
- Runners-up: Glentoran

Tournament statistics
- Matches played: 117
- Goals scored: 446 (3.81 per match)

The 2005–06 Irish Cup was the 126th edition of the Irish Cup, Northern Ireland's premier football knock-out cup competition. It concluded on 6 May 2006 with the final.

Portadown were the defending champions, winning their 3rd Irish Cup last season after a 5–1 win over Larne in the 2005 final. This season Portadown reached the quarter-finals, but were defeated by Glentoran. Linfield went on to lift the cup for the 37th time, defeating archrivals Glentoran 2–1 in the final. This was the 15th and to date, last time that both clubs have met in the final.

== Results ==
=== First preliminary round ===
| Team 1 | Score | Team 2 |
|---|---|---|
| Barn United | 2–1 | Desertmartin |
| Magherafelt Sky Blues | 4–0 | Draperstown Celtic |
| Malachians | 2–1 | Oxford United Stars |
| Newcastle | 1–3 | Downpatrick |
| Portglenone | 0–3 | Bryansburn Rangers |
| Seagoe | 1–11 | Wellington Recreation |
| Sirocco Works | 2–4 | Tandragee Rovers |
| Strabane | w/o | Coleraine Crusaders |

=== Second preliminary round ===
| Team 1 | Score | Team 2 |
|---|---|---|
| Abbey Villa | 4–1 | Banbridge AFC |
| Ballymacash Rangers | 4–2 | Larne Tech Old Boys |
| Ballynahinch United | 3–1 | Dundonald |
| Bangor Amateurs | 0–3 | Laurelvale |
| Blackers Mill | 1–2 | Newington Youth |
| Bryansburn Rangers | 4–3 | Roe Valley |
| Cookstown Olympic | 1–3 | Downshire Young Men |
| Dergview | 4–3 | Barn United |
| Dervock | 2–4 | Trojans |
| Dromore Amateurs | 2–5 | Annagh United |
| Dungiven Celtic | 4–1 | Markethill Swifts |
| Fivemiletown United | 1–2 | Albert Foundry |
| Glebe Rangers | 4–0 | Broomhedge |
| Grove United | 1–2 | Downpatrick |
| Hanover | 3–1 | Churchill United |
| Islandmagee | 4–0 | Saintfield United |
| Killymoon Rangers | 1–0 | Magherafelt Sky Blues |
| Lisburn Rangers | 1–0 | UUC |
| Malachians | 1–0 | Wellington Recreation |
| Newbuildings United | 3–2 | Donard Hospital |
| Portadown BBOB | 1–2 | Dunmurry Young Men |
| Rosario Youth | 9–1 | Lower Maze |
| Shorts | 4–3 | Holywood |
| Sport & Leisure | 2–5 | Nortel |
| Strabane | 2–1 | Orangefield Old Boys |
| Tandragee Rovers | 3–2 | Warrenpoint Town |

=== First round ===
| Team 1 | Score | Team 2 |
|---|---|---|
| Laurelvale | 0–4 | Albert Foundry |
| Trojans | 0–3 | Killymoon Rangers |

=== Second round ===
| Team 1 | Score | Team 2 |
|---|---|---|
| Abbey Villa | 0–3 | Dergview |
| Annagh United | 2–4 | Ballymacash Rangers |
| Ballynahinch United | 1–0 | Lisburn Rangers |
| Bryansburn Rangers | 2–5 | Malachians |
| Downpatrick | 0–4 | Islandmagee |
| Downshire Young Men | 1–4 | Glebe Rangers |
| Dunmurry Young Men | 0–4 | Albert Foundry |
| Hanover | 3–1 | Rosario Youth |
| Killymoon Rangers | 2–4 | Newington Youth |
| Nortel | 7–1 | Tandragee Rovers |
| Shorts | 0–1 | Dungiven Celtic |
| Strabane | 2–1 | Newbuildings United |

=== Third round ===
| Team 1 | Score | Team 2 |
|---|---|---|
| Ards Rangers | 2–3 | Portstewart |
| Ballymoney United | 2–1 | Drumaness Mills |
| Banbridge Town | 5–0 | 1st Bangor Old Boys |
| Brantwood | 1–2 | Islandmagee |
| Chimney Corner | 2–1 | Ballinamallard United |
| Comber Recreation | 4–2 | Albert Foundry |
| Crumlin United | 0–2 | Dundela |
| Donegal Celtic | 3–0 | Hanover |
| Dromara Village | 1–0 | Dunmurry Recreation |
| East Belfast | 0–3 | Malachians |
| Harland & Wolff Welders | 4–1 | Dungiven Celtic |
| Kilmore Recreation | 2–0 | Dergview |
| Knockbreda | 1–1 (a.e.t.) (2–3 p) | Killyleagh Youth |
| Lurgan Celtic | 8–0 | Rathfriland Rangers |
| Moyola Park | 5–4 | Nortel |
| PSNI | 4–2 | Ballymacash Rangers |
| Queen's University | 3–2 | Ballynahinch United |
| Strabane | 2–4 | Wellington Recreation |
| Wakehurst | 3–0 | Glebe Rangers |

=== Fourth round ===
| Team 1 | Score | Team 2 |
|---|---|---|
| Banbridge Town | 5–0 | Malachians |
| Chimney Corner | 1–2 | Portstewart |
| Dundela | 5–2 | Dromara Village |
| Harland & Wolff Welders | 2–1 | Comber Recreation |
| Killyleagh Youth | 1–4 | Newington Youth |
| Kilmore Recreation | 1–0 | Islandmagee |
| Moyola Park | 2–3 | Coagh United |
| PSNI | 3–2 | Lurgan Celtic |
| Queen's University | 0–2 | Donegal Celtic |
| Wakehurst | 1–5 | Ballymoney United |

=== Fifth round ===
| Team 1 | Score | Team 2 |
|---|---|---|
| Ards | 1–2 | Glentoran |
| Ballymena United | 4–0 | Kilmore Recreation |
| Ballymoney United | 1–2 | Carrick Rangers |
| Ballynure Old Boys | 0–4 | Ballyclare Comrades |
| Banbridge Town | 0–0 | Loughgall |
| Cliftonville | 1–1 | Dungannon Swifts |
| Coleraine | 1–1 | Newry City |
| Crusaders | 2–2 | Portadown |
| Glenavon | 2–1 | Dundela |
| Harland & Wolff Welders | 1–1 | Bangor |
| Institute | 1–3 | Lisburn Distillery |
| Larne | 1–1 | Donegal Celtic |
| Linfield | 5–0 | Armagh City |
| Newington Youth | 1–1 | Coagh United |
| PSNI | 0–5 | Limavady United |
| Tobermore United | 2–3 | Portstewart |

==== Replays ====
| Team 1 | Score | Team 2 |
|---|---|---|
| Bangor | 3–1 | Harland & Wolff Welders |
| Coagh United | 0–2 | Newington Youth |
| Dungannon Swifts | 1–0 | Cliftonville |
| Larne | 3–1 | Donegal Celtic |
| Loughgall | 3–2 | Banbridge Town |
| Newry City | 0–0 (3–4p) | Coleraine |
| Portadown | 1–0 | Crusaders |

=== Sixth round ===
| Team 1 | Score | Team 2 |
|---|---|---|
| Dungannon Swifts | 1–1 | Portadown |
| Glenavon | 3–0 | Coleraine |
| Glentoran | 1–0 | Ballyclare Comrades |
| Larne | 3–0 | Carrick Rangers |
| Limavady United | 1–3 | Bangor |
| Linfield | 1–1 | Loughgall |
| Lisburn Distillery | 0–0 | Ballymena United |
| Newington Youth | 1–0 | Portstewart |

==== Replays ====
| Team 1 | Score | Team 2 |
|---|---|---|
| Ballymena United | 1–2 | Lisburn Distillery |
| Loughgall | 1–3 | Linfield |
| Portadown | 3–1 | Dungannon Swifts |

=== Quarter-finals ===
| Team 1 | Score | Team 2 |
|---|---|---|
| Lisburn Distillery | 0–1 | Bangor |
| Glentoran | 2–0 | Portadown |
| Linfield | 3–0 | Glenavon |
| Newington Youth | 1–2 | Larne |

=== Semi-finals ===
| Team 1 | Score | Team 2 |
|---|---|---|
| Bangor | 1–3 | Linfield |
| Larne | 0–2 | Glentoran |

=== Final ===
6 May 2006

| Glentoran | 1 – 2 | Linfield |
|---|---|---|
| Halliday 44' | Report | Thompson 45', 65' |

Windsor Park, Belfast
Attendance: 12,500
