= 2007–08 Irish Cup =

Tournament details
- Country: Northern Ireland
- Teams: 106

Final positions
- Champions: Linfield (39th win)
- Runners-up: Coleraine

Tournament statistics
- Matches played: 116
- Goals scored: 438 (3.78 per match)

The 2007–08 Irish Cup was the 128th edition of the Irish Cup, Northern Ireland's premier football knock-out cup competition. The competition began with the preliminary round on 15 September 2007 and culminated with the final at Windsor Park, Belfast, on 3 May 2008.

Linfield were the defending champions, winning their 38th Irish Cup last season after a 3–2 penalty shootout win over Dungannon Swifts in the 2007 final after the game finished 2–2 after extra time. They successfully defended the cup to win it for the third successive season by defeating Coleraine 2–1 in the final.

== Results ==
=== Preliminary round ===
Team 1	Score	Team 2
Abbey Villa	6–1	Strabane
Albert Foundry	5–3	Grove United
Churchill United	0–1	Saintfield United
Clough Rangers	5–0	Dungiven Celtic
Desertmartin	2–3	Donard Hospital
Downpatrick	3–0	Dunmurry Young Men
Draperstown Celtic	2–1	Nortel
Hanover	4–0	Lower Maze
Holywood	2–3	Ballymacash Rangers
Islandmagee	2–1	Fivemiletown United
Laurelvale	0–7	Dergview
Lurgan Town Boys	1–4	Bloomfield
Magherafelt Sky Blues	8–2	Dunaghy
Malachians	4–0	Newcastle
Markethill Swifts	4–3	Roe Valley
Orangefield Old Boys	4–1	Ballynure Old Boys
Oxford United	0–1	Newbuildings United
Raceview	3–2	Lisburn Rangers
Sport & Leisure Swifts	6–0	Seagoe
Tandragee Rovers	2–0	Shorts
Wellington Recreation	6–1	Bryansburn Rangers

=== First round ===
Team 1	Score	Team 2
Ballymacash Rangers	4–2	Blackers Mill
Bangor Amateurs	0–4	Malachians
Barn United	1–3	Tandragee Rovers
Clough Rangers	0–6	Downpatrick
Dergview	5–1	Wellington Recreation
Downshire Young Men	2–0	Hanover
Dundonald	2–3	Abbey Villa
Islandmagee	5–0	Killymoon Rangers
Magherafelt Sky Blues	2–3	Bloomfield
Newbuildings United	2–3	Markethill Swifts
Newington Youth Club	7–2	Draperstown Celtic
Orangefield Old Boys	1–4	Albert Foundry
Portadown BBOB	1–3	Rosario Youth Club
Sport & Leisure Swifts	7–0	Saintfield United
UUC	1–2	Raceview
Warrenpoint Town	4–1	Donard Hospital

=== Second round ===
Team 1	Score	Team 2
Abbey Villa	4–0	Dergview
Albert Foundry	5–0	Ballymacash Rangers
Downshire Young Men	2–4	Markethill Swifts
Islandmagee	0–1	Rosario Youth Club
Malachians	4–2	Warrenpoint Town
Raceview	3–2	Bloomfield
Sport & Leisure Swifts	0–4	Newington Youth Club
Tandragee Rovers	1–2	Downpatrick

=== Third round ===
Team 1	Score	Team 2
1st Bangor Old Boys	2–3	Newington Youth Club
Albert Foundry	1–1 (4–5p)	Ballymoney United
Ards Rangers	3–1	Oxford United Stars
Ballinamallard United	0–0 (2–4p)	Killyleagh Youth
Banbridge Town	8–2	East Belfast
Brantwood	2–0	Knockbreda Parish
Crewe United	1–2	Harland & Wolff Welders
Crumlin United	0–1	Coagh United
Drumaness Mills	3–2	Rosario Youth Club
Dundela	1–0	Malachians
Dunmurry Rec.	2–1	Raceview
Glebe Rangers	3–1	Annagh United
Kilmore Recreation	0–4	Dromara Village
Lurgan Celtic	0–1	Abbey Villa
Markethill Swifts	1–5	Downpatrick
Moyola Park	5–3	Chimney Corner
Portstewart	2–1	Comber Recreation
PSNI	5–2	Trojans
Rathfriland Rangers	0–2	Queen's University
Wakehurst	5–2	Sirocco Works

=== Fourth round ===
Team 1	Score	Team 2
Ards Rangers	0–2	Downpatrick
Ballymoney United	3–1	Coagh United
Banbridge Town	4–0	Glebe Rangers
Brantwood	1–0	PSNI
Dromara Village	0–1	Newington Youth Club
Dundela	2–0	Wakehurst
Dunmurry Rec.	3–2	Drumaness Mills
Harland & Wolff Welders	0–1	Portstewart
Killyleagh Youth	1–1 (5–3p)	Queen's University
Moyola Park	2–5	Abbey Villa

=== Fifth round ===
Team 1	Score	Team 2
Ards	1–1	Brantwood
Armagh City	1–5	Crusaders
Ballyclare Comrades	0–0	Ballymoney United
Banbridge Town	2–3	Abbey Villa
Coleraine	1–0	Tobermore United
Donegal Celtic	3–0	Carrick Rangers
Dundela	4–0	Portstewart
Glenavon	1–2	Bangor
Glentoran	0–0	Lisburn Distillery
Institute	6–0	Dunmurry Rec.
Killyleagh Youth	0–1	Downpatrick
Larne	2–3	Cliftonville
Limavady United	1–1	Dungannon Swifts
Loughgall	0–3	Linfield
Newry City	2–2	Ballymena United
Portadown	1–0	Newington Youth Club

==== Replays ====
Team 1	Score	Team 2
Ards	0–1	Brantwood
Ballyclare Comrades	1–0	Ballymoney United
Ballymena United	0–0 (2–4p)	Newry City
Dungannon Swifts	2–1	Limavady United
Lisburn Distillery	1–3	Glentoran

=== Sixth round ===
Team 1	Score	Team 2
Ballyclare Comrades	2–2	Institute
Cliftonville	1–0	Crusaders
Coleraine	5–1	Brantwood
Donegal Celtic	1–0	Abbey Villa
Dungannon Swifts	0–2	Glentoran
Linfield	3–0	Bangor
Newry City	1–1	Dundela
Portadown	2–1	Downpatrick

==== Replays ====
Team 1	Score	Team 2
Dundela	0–1	Newry City
Institute	2–0	Ballyclare Comrades

=== Quarter-finals ===
Team 1	Score	Team 2
Cliftonville	4–3	Portadown
Glentoran	1–2	Donegal Celtic
Institute	0–0	Coleraine
Newry City	1–1	Linfield

==== Replays ====
Team 1	Score	Team 2
Coleraine	5–1	Institute
Linfield	4–0	Newry City

=== Semi-finals ===
Team 1	Score	Team 2
Cliftonville	1–2	Linfield
Coleraine	1–1	Donegal Celtic

==== Replay ====
Team 1	Score	Team 2
Coleraine	2–1	Donegal Celtic

=== Final ===
3 May 2008

Linfield	2 – 1	Coleraine
Thompson 49', 52'	Report	McLaughlin 19'

Windsor Park, Belfast
Attendance: 8,452
