= 1996–97 Irish Cup =

Tournament details
- Country: Northern Ireland
- Teams: 89

Final positions
- Champions: Glenavon (5th win)
- Runners-up: Cliftonville

Tournament statistics
- Matches played: 109
- Goals scored: 389 (3.57 per match)

The 1996–97 Irish Cup was the 117th edition of the Irish Cup, Northern Ireland's premier football knock-out cup competition. It concluded on 3 May 1997 with the final.

Glentoran were the defending champions after winning their 16th Irish Cup last season, with a 1–0 win over Glenavon in the 1996 final. This season Glenavon went one better by winning the cup for the 5th time, with a 1–0 win over Cliftonville in the final.

== Results ==
=== First round ===
Dungiven Celtic and Malachians were given byes into the second round.

Team 1	Score	Team 2
1st Shankill NISC	3–5	Donard Hospital
AFC Craigavon	2–5	Oxford United Stars
Abbey Villa	0–2	Downshire Young Men
Annagh United	2–4	Shorts
Armoy United	6–1	Killymoon Rangers
Ballynahinch United	2–1	Orangefield Old Boys
Bangor Amateurs	4–2	Ards Rangers
Bessbrook United	1–1	Glebe Rangers
Bridge End United	1–2	Rathfriland Rangers
Cullybackey	1–5	Civil Service
Dromara Village	1–1	Comber Recreation
Drummond United	4–2	Roe Valley
Hanover	2–0	Larne Tech Old Boys
Harland & Wolff Welders	4–0	1st Bangor Old Boys
Islandmagee	5–3	Laurelvale
Magherafelt Sky Blues	0–0	East Belfast
Mountnorris	0–1	Killyleagh Youth
Portglenone	5–4	Queen's University
Portstewart	4–0	Seapatrick
Richhill	4–0	1st Liverpool
Saintfield United	2–2	Barn United
UUC	0–4	Northern Telecom
Wellington Recreation	0–2	Harland & Wolff Sports

==== Replays ====
Team 1	Score	Team 2
Barn United	0–0 (a.e.t.) (6–5 p)	Saintfield United
Comber Recreation	1–2 (a.e.t.)	Dromara Village
East Belfast	8–0	Magherafelt Sky Blues
Glebe Rangers	4–2 (a.e.t.)	Bessbrook United

=== Second round ===
Team 1	Score	Team 2
Armoy United	3–4	Donard Hospital
Ballynahinch United	4–3	Harland & Wolff Sport
Dromara Village	2–1	Killyleagh Youth
Drummond United	10–0	Richhill
Dungiven Celtic	1–4	Harland & Wolff Welders
Glebe Rangers	1–2	Barn United
Hanover	3–5	Oxford United Stars
Islandmagee	4–1	Bangor Amateurs
Malachians	1–3	Civil Service
Nortel	2–2	East Belfast
Portglenone	1–1	Downshire Young Men
Shorts	1–1	Portstewart

==== Replays ====
Team 1	Score	Team 2
Downshire Young Men	1–2 (a.e.t.)	Portglenone
East Belfast	1–1 (a.e.t.) (2–4 p)	Northern Telecom

=== Second round (A) ===
The following teams were given byes into the third round: Barn United, Civil Service, Donard Hospital, Dromara Village, Northern Telecom, Oxford United Stars and Portstewart.

Team 1	Score	Team 2
Drummond United	2–2	Rathfriland Rangers
Harland & Wolff Welders	0–0	Ballynahinch United
Portglenone	1–3	Islandmagee

==== Replays ====
Team 1	Score	Team 2
Ballynahinch United	2–5	Harland & Wolff Welders
Rathfriland Rangers	2–5	Drummond United

=== Third round ===
Team 1	Score	Team 2
Ballynahinch United	1–0	Civil Service
Barn United	2–2	Donard Hospital
Dromara Village	3–0	Oxford United Stars
Northern Telecom	1–0	Drummond United
Portstewart	2–1	Islandmagee

==== Replay ====
Team 1	Score	Team 2
Donard Hospital	2–3	Barn United

=== Fourth round ===
Team 1	Score	Team 2
Banbridge Town	0–2	Portstewart
British Telecom	5–2	Cookstown United
Chimney Corner	6–0	Kilmore Recreation
Coagh United	2–1	Ballymoney United
Crumlin United	4–1	Tobermore United
Crewe United	0–2	Brantwood
Drumaness Mills	2–1	Armagh City
Dundela	1–2	Barn United
Dunmurry Recreation	1–1	Northern Telecom
FC Enkalon	2–2	Ballinamallard United
Institute	2–1	Donegal Celtic
Limavady United	3–1	Ballynahinch United
Park	1–1	Moyola Park
RUC	1–1	Dromara Village

==== Replays ====
Team 1	Score	Team 2
Dromara Village	0–4	RUC
Enkalon	1–0	Ballinamallard United
Moyola Park	0–1	Park
Northern Telecom	0–6	Dunmurry Recreation

=== Fifth round ===
Team 1	Score	Team 2
Ballyclare Comrades	2–3	Cliftonville
Bangor	3–0	Ballymena United
Brantwood	0–2	Dundela
British Telecom	1–1	Crumlin United
Carrick Rangers	0–0	RUC
Coleraine	2–1	Linfield
Crusaders	4–1	Institute
Drumaness Mills	1–3	Limavady United
Dungannon Swifts	1–1	Loughgall
Enkalon	1–1	Portstewart
Glenavon	1–0	Ards
Glentoran	4–0	Distillery
Larne	0–2	Coagh United
Newry Town	0–0	Omagh Town
Park	0–4	Chimney Corner
Portadown	3–0	Dunmurry Recreation

==== Replays ====
Team 1	Score	Team 2
Crumlin United	4–1	British Telecom
Loughgall	3–1	Dungannon Swifts
Omagh Town	1–0	Newry Town
Portstewart	3–1	Enkalon
RUC	2–1	Carrick Rangers

=== Sixth round ===
Team 1	Score	Team 2
Crumlin United	1–2	Loughgall
Crusaders	1–0	Portadown
Dundela	1–2	Coagh United
Glenavon	2–0	Glentoran
Limavady United	1–1	Bangor
Omagh Town	3–2	Chimney Corner
Portstewart	0–1	Coleraine
RUC	0–3	Cliftonville

==== Replay ====
Team 1	Score	Team 2
Bangor	0–2	Limavady United

=== Quarter-finals ===
Team 1	Score	Team 2
Cliftonville	3–1	Crusaders
Glenavon	4–1	Coagh United
Loughgall	1–1	Coleraine
Omagh Town	2–2	Limavady United

==== Replays ====
Team 1	Score	Team 2
Coleraine	0–1	Loughgall
Limavady United	0–1	Omagh Town

=== Semi-finals ===
Team 1	Score	Team 2
Cliftonville	3–1	Loughgall
Glenavon	5–0	Omagh Town

=== Final ===
3 May 1997

Glenavon	1 – 0	Cliftonville
Grant 23'	Report

Windsor Park, Belfast
