= 1991–92 Irish Cup =

Tournament details
- Country: Northern Ireland
- Teams: 96

Final positions
- Champions: Glenavon (4th win)
- Runners-up: Linfield

Tournament statistics
- Matches played: 105
- Goals scored: 399 (3.8 per match)

The 1991–92 Irish Cup was the 112th edition of the Irish Cup, Northern Ireland's premier football knock-out cup competition. It concluded on 2 May 1992 with the final.

Portadown were the defending champions after winning their 1st Irish Cup last season, defeating Glenavon 2–1 in the 1991 final. This season Glenavon went one better by winning their 4th Irish cup, defeating Linfield 2–1 in the final.

== Results ==
=== First round ===
The following teams were given byes into the second round: 1st Liverpool, Annagh United, Bangor Amateurs, Bridge End United, Cromac Albion, Dervock United, Donard Hospital, Downshire Young Men, Drumaness Mills, Dungiven Celtic, East Belfast, Hanover, Harland & Wolff Sport, Islandmagee, Killyleagh Youth, Larne Tech Old Boys, Mosside United, Nitos Athletic, Northern Telecom, Oxford United Stars, Portglenone, RUC, Saintfield United, Shorts, Southend United, Star of the Sea, UUC and UUJ.

Team 1	Score	Team 2
Annalong Swifts	3–3	Ballynahinch United
Armagh City	5–0	Roe Valley
Armagh Thistle	2–5	Ards Rangers
Armoy United	3–0	Drummond United
Barn United	3–1	Sirocco Works
Civil Service	0–1	Killymoon Rangers
Cullybackey	1–6	Dromara Village
Dromore Amateurs	2–1	Rathfriland Rangers
Fisher Body	4–3	GEC
Glebe Rangers	1–3	AFC
Harland & Wolff Welders	13–0	Magherafelt Crusaders
Institute	0–4	1st Bangor Old Boys
Macosquin	3–3	Connor
Magherafelt Sky Blues	0–4	Portstewart
Queen's University	1–2	Comber Rec.
Tandragee Rovers	2–0	Orangefield Old Boys

==== Replay ====
Team 1	Score	Team 2
Connor	2–1	Macosquin

=== Second round ===
Team 1	Score	Team 2
1st Bangor Old Boys	3–2	Connor
1st Liverpool	w/o	Bangor Amateurs
AFC	3–2	Larne Tech Old Boys
Armoy United	2–1	Saintfield United
Bridge End United	3–0	Killymoon Rangers
Comber Rec.	1–0	UUJ
Cromac Albion	0–2	Ards Rangers
Dervock United	2–3	Harland & Wolff Sports
Dungiven Celtic	0–2	Drumaness Mills
East Belfast	4–0	Barn United
Fisher Body	1–5	Killyleagh United
Harland & Wolff Welders	2–0	Dromara Village
Islandmagee	1–2	Star of the Sea
Nitos Athletic	2–0	Mosside United
Northern Telecom	3–1	Annalong Swifts
Oxford United Stars	w/o	Downshire Young Men
Portglenone	2–2	Armagh City
Portstewart	1–1	Hanover
RUC	2–2	Annagh United
Shorts	4–0	UUC
Southend United	1–7	Donard Hospital
Tandragee Rovers	4–2	Dromore Amateurs

==== Replays ====
Team 1	Score	Team 2
Annagh United	2–1 (a.e.t.)	RUC
Armagh City	4–2	Portglenone
Hanover	1–2	Portstewart

=== Third round ===
Team 1	Score	Team 2
1st Liverpool	0–1	Donard Hospital
AFC	4–3	Comber Rec.
Annagh United	2–2	Armoy United
East Belfast	7–0	Ards Rangers
Harland & Wolff Sports	6–0	Star of the Sea
Harland & Wolff Welders	1–3	Armagh City
Northern Telecom	1–3	Killyleagh Youth
Oxford United Stars	2–0	Drumaness Mills
Portstewart	3–2	Bridge End United
Shorts	2–4	1st Bangor Old Boys
Tandragee Rovers	5–1	Nitos Athletic

==== Replay ====
Team 1	Score	Team 2
Armoy United	3–1	Annagh United

=== Fourth round ===
Team 1	Score	Team 2
Banbridge Town	2–1	Harland & Wolff Sports
Brantwood	2–2	Oxford United Stars
British Telecom	1–1	East Belfast
Chimney Corner	0–2	Ballinamallard United
Coagh United	2–1	Armoy United
Crewe United	1–4	Dunmurry Rec.
Crumlin United	0–1	Donegal Celtic
Dundela	1–0	1st Bangor Old Boys
Dungannon Swifts	2–0	AFC
FC Enkalon	0–5	Donard Hospital
Kilmore Rec.	3–2	Ballymoney United
Limavady United	3–1	Killyleagh Youth
Moyola Park	3–3	Armagh City
Portstewart	3–1	Tandragee Rovers
Tobermore United	2–3	Park

==== Replays ====
Team 1	Score	Team 2
Armagh City	2–4	Moyola Park
Brantwood	1–3	Oxford United Stars
East Belfast	2–2 (a.e.t.) (4–3 p)	British Telecom

=== Fifth round ===
Team 1	Score	Team 2
Ballyclare Comrades	4–1	Coagh United
Bangor	1–2	Ards
Crusaders	1–1	Newry Town
Dundela	2–5	Ballymena United
Dungannon Swifts	2–2	Coleraine
Dunmurry Rec.	4–0	Donard Hospital
Glenavon	4–1	Park
Glentoran	2–0	Donegal Celtic
Kilmore Recreation	0–1	Cliftonville
Larne	1–0	Distillery
Limavady United	3–1	Ballinamallard United
Linfield	4–0	Loughgall
Moyola Park	1–1	Banbridge Town
Omagh Town	3–1	Portstewart
Oxford United Stars	1–0	East Belfast
Portadown	3–0	Carrick Rangers

==== Replays ====
Team 1	Score	Team 2
Banbridge Town	2–1	Moyola Park
Coleraine	0–2	Dungannon Swifts
Newry Town	1–3	Crusaders

=== Sixth round ===
Team 1	Score	Team 2
Ards	3–2	Dunmurry Rec.
Ballyclare Comrades	0–1	Oxford United Stars
Banbridge Town	2–2	Linfield
Cliftonville	2–0	Larne
Glentoran	0–0	Glenavon
Limavady United	0–0	Crusaders
Omagh Town	1–1	Ballymena United
Portadown	4–0	Dungannon Swifts

==== Replays ====
Team 1	Score	Team 2
Ballymena United	3–0	Omagh Town
Crusaders	2–0	Limavady United
Glenavon	4–0	Glentoran
Linfield	3–0	Banbridge Town

=== Quarter-finals ===
Team 1	Score	Team 2
Ballymena United	4–0	Oxford United Stars
Glenavon	3–0	Ards
Linfield	1–0	Cliftonville
Portadown	0–1	Crusaders

=== Semi-finals ===
Team 1	Score	Team 2
Glenavon	3–1	Ballymena United
Linfield	2–0	Crusaders

=== Final ===
2 May 1992

Glenavon	2 – 1	Linfield
Ferris 42'; McMahon 56'	Report	McGaughey 13'

The Oval, Belfast
