= 1993–94 Irish Cup =

Tournament details
- Country: Northern Ireland
- Teams: 93

Final positions
- Champions: Linfield (34th win)
- Runners-up: Bangor

Tournament statistics
- Matches played: 109
- Goals scored: 396 (3.63 per match)

The 1993–94 Irish Cup was the 114th edition of the Irish Cup, Northern Ireland's premier football knock-out cup competition. It concluded on 7 May 1994 with the final.

Bangor were the defending champions after winning their 1st Irish Cup last season, with a 1–0 win over Ards in the 1993 final second replay after the first two games ended as 1–1 draws. This season they reached the final again (to date, their last final appearance), but lost 2–0 to Linfield who won the cup for the 34th time, 12 years after their last Irish Cup win in 1982.

== Results ==
=== First round ===
The following teams were given byes into the second round: Ballymacash Rangers, Bessbrook United, Connor, Donard Hospital, Downshire Young Men, Glebe Rangers, Harland & Wolff Sports, Magherafelt Sky Blues, Orangefield Old Boys, Portstewart, Roe Valley and UUJ.

Team 1	Score	Team 2
1st Bangor Old Boys	1–0	Dromore Amateurs
1st Liverpool	2–6	Abbey Villa
1st Shankill NISC	3–0	Drummond United
Armagh City	3–1	Northern Telecom
Armoy United	3–2	Tandragee Rovers
Ballynahinch United	2–1	Shorts
Barn United	2–2	Dromara Village
Bridgend United	4–1	Wellington Recreation
Comber Recreation	2–4	AFC
Cullybackey	1–2	Rathfriland Rangers
Dervock United	1–4	Queen's University
Dungiven Celtic	3–3	Bangor Amateurs
Hanover	0–5	Ards Rangers
Harland & Wolff Welders	2–0	Civil Service
Institute	3–4	Oxford United Stars
Islandmagee	5–1	Annalong Swifts
Larne Tech Old Boys	1–3	Cookstown Royals
Portglenone	1–3	ECC
Richhill	8–1	Killymoon Rangers
Saintfield United	1–1	Killyleagh Youth
Southend United	1–5	Seapatrick
UUC	0–1	East Belfast

==== Replays ====
Team 1	Score	Team 2
Bangor Amateurs	0–1	Dungiven Celtic
Dromara Village	2–1	Barn United
Killyleagh Youth	2–1	Saintfield United

=== Second round ===
The following teams were given byes into the third round: AFC and Oxford United Stars.

Team 1	Score	Team 2
1st Shankill NISC	2–3	Portstewart
Abbey Villa	4–3	Glebe Rangers
Armagh City	2–0	Seapatrick
Armoy United	0–0	Ballynahinch United
Bridgend United	1–1	Dromara Village
Connor	5–3	Roe Valley
Cookstown Royals	6–4	ECC
Donard Hospital	1–4	1st Bangor Old Boys
Dungiven Celtic	2–1	Ballymacash Rangers
Harland & Wolff Sports	4–2	Islandmagee
Harland & Wolff Welders	2–4	East Belfast
Killyleagh Youth	3–1	Magherafelt Sky Blues
Queen's University	2–1	Ards Rangers
Rathfriland Rangers	1–2	Orangefield Old Boys
Richill	0–3	Downshire Young Men
UUJ	3–1	Bessbrook United

==== Replays ====
Team 1	Score	Team 2
Ballynahinch United	0–2	Armoy United
Dromara Village	5–0	Bridgend United

=== Third round ===
Team 1	Score	Team 2
Armagh City	7–0	Cookstown Royals
Dromara Village	2–1	Connor
East Belfast	3–0	Armoy United
Harland & Wolff Sports	1–3	Abbey Villa
Killyleagh Youth	2–0	Downshire Young Men
Orangefield Old Boys	1–0	AFC
Oxford United Stars	0–1	1st Bangor Old Boys
Queen's University	0–1	Portstewart
UUJ	1–3	Dungiven Celtic

=== Fourth round ===
Team 1	Score	Team 2
Armagh City	3–4	Abbey Villa
Ballinamallard United	1–1	Dromara Village
Brantwood	4–0	Crumlin United
British Telecom	1–2	Donegal Celtic
Chimney Corner	3–1	Kilmore Recreation
Cookstown United	1–4	Coagh United
Crewe United	0–1	1st Bangor Old Boys
Drumaness Mills	7–0	Orangefield Old Boys
Dunmurry Recreation	1–2	Banbridge Town
Dungannon Swifts	3–5	Dundela
Dungiven Celtic	0–0	East Belfast
Limavady United	3–1	FC Enkalon
Loughgall	1–1	Portstewart
Park	5–4	Ballymoney United
RUC	2–2	Moyola Park
Tobermore United	0–1	Killyleagh Youth

==== Replays ====
Team 1	Score	Team 2
Ballinamallard United	3–0	Dromara Village
East Belfast	3–1	Dungiven Celtic
Loughgall	2–0	Portstewart
Moyola Park	2–1	RUC

=== Fifth round ===
Team 1	Score	Team 2
Abbey Villa	3–0	Killyleagh Youth
Ards	2–2	Glentoran
Ballyclare Comrades	1–1	Cliftonville
Ballymena United	0–3	Carrick Rangers
Banbridge Town	1–3	Linfield
Bangor	1–0	Crusaders
Chimney Corner	0–5	Distillery
Donegal Celtic	1–0	Limavady United
Dundela	2–0	Drumaness Mills
Glenavon	2–1	Brantwood
Larne	1–4	Coleraine
Loughgall	5–0	1st Bangor Old Boys
Moyola Park	1–1	Ballinamallard United
Newry Town	1–1	Park
Omagh Town	2–1	Coagh United
Portadown	3–0	East Belfast

==== Replays ====
Team 1	Score	Team 2
Ballinamallard United	2–1	Moyola Park
Cliftonville	1–0	Ballyclare Comrades
Glentoran	3–2	Ards
Park	1–4	Newry Town

=== Sixth round ===
Team 1	Score	Team 2
Ballinamallard United	0–3	Cliftonville
Distillery	1–0	Abbey Villa
Coleraine	2–3	Glenavon
Glentoran	4–3	Dundela
Linfield	2–0	Carrick Rangers
Loughgall	1–2	Bangor
Newry Town	0–0	Omagh Town
Portadown	4–0	Donegal Celtic

==== Replay ====
Team 1	Score	Team 2
Omagh Town	2–2 (a.e.t.) (6–5 p)	Newry Town

=== Quarter-finals ===
Team 1	Score	Team 2
Distillery	2–4	Glenavon
Glentoran	0–2	Bangor
Linfield	0–0	Cliftonville
Omagh Town	1–2	Portadown

==== Replay ====
Team 1	Score	Team 2
Cliftonville	0–1	Linfield

=== Semi-finals ===
Team 1	Score	Team 2
Bangor	2–0	Portadown
Linfield	3–0	Glenavon

=== Final ===
7 May 1994

Linfield	2 – 0	Bangor
Peebles 45'; Fenlon 90'	Report

The Oval, Belfast
Attendance: 15,000
Referee: J. Ferry
