= 2008–09 Irish Cup =

Tournament details
- Country: Northern Ireland
- Teams: 100

Final positions
- Champions: Crusaders (3rd win)
- Runners-up: Cliftonville

Tournament statistics
- Matches played: 102
- Goals scored: 419 (4.11 per match)

The 2008–09 Irish Cup was the 129th edition of the Irish Cup, Northern Ireland's premier football knock-out cup competition. The competition began on 25 October 2008 with the first round and ended on 9 May 2009 with the final.

Linfield were the defending champions, winning their third consecutive Irish Cup the previous season after a 2–1 win over Coleraine in the 2008 final. This season they reached the semi-finals, but were defeated by Cliftonville. Crusaders went on to lift the trophy, beating Cliftonville 1–0 in the final. In doing so, they earned a place in the second qualifying round of the 2009–10 UEFA Europa League.

== Results ==
=== First round ===
The matches were played on 25 October and 1 November 2008.

Team 1	Score	Team 2
1st Bangor Old Boys	1–4	Dunmurry Young Men
Ballymacash Rangers	1–3	Annagh United
Bloomfield	1–4	Grove United
Bryansburn Rangers	3–2	Sirocco Works
Chimney Corner	0–5	Rosario Youth Club
Crewe United	2–3	Crumlin United
Desertmartin	0–3	Queen's University
Donard Hospital	1–2	Raceview
Downpatrick	4–0	Barn United
Draperstown Celtic	2–0	Magherafelt Sky Blues
Dromara Village	3–0	Sport & Leisure Swifts
Dunmurry Rec.	2–1	Ballynure Old Boys
Holywood	1–2	Drumaness Mills
Harland & Wolff Welders	1–2	Warrenpoint Town
Kilmore Recreation	3–1	East Belfast
Laurelvale	2–3	Moyola Park
Lisburn Rangers	0–1	Rathfriland Rangers
Lurgan Town Boys	2–4	Islandmagee
Markethill Swifts	2–4	UUC
Newcastle	3–1	Seagoe
Oxford United Stars	1–2	Dungiven Celtic
Portstewart	3–2	Comber Recreation
Roe Valley	1–6	Newbuildings United
Tandragee Rovers	7–0	Portadown BBOB
Wakehurst	0–2	Dundela
Wellington Recreation	2–2 (4–2 p)	Downshire Young Men

=== Second round ===
The games were played on 22 November 2008.

Team 1	Score	Team 2
Annagh United	5–0	Rathfriland Rangers
Ards Rangers	3–4	Islandmagee
Brantwood	1–2	Queen's University
Churchill United	3–6	Newcastle
Crumlin United	9–0	Dunaghy
Dollingstown	6–2	Strabane
Draperstown Celtic	3–5	Nortel
Dromara Village	4–3	Raceview
Drumaness Mills	4–1	Bryansburn Rangers
Dundela	5–0	Saintfield United
Dungiven Celtic	2–3	Newbuildings United
Dunmurry Rec.	1–0	Abbey Villa
Fivemiletown United	1–3	Warrenpoint Town
Grove United	0–1	Portstewart
Hanover	3–1	Moyola Park
Killyleagh Youth	2–0	Lower Maze
Knockbreda Parish	2–4	Downpatrick
Lurgan Celtic	1–0	Oxford United Stars
Newington Youth Club	4–2	Rosario Youth Club
PSNI	4–3	Albert Foundry
Tandragee Rovers	1–2	Malachians
UUC	1–3	Kilmore Recreation
Wellington Recreation	3–2	Dunmurry Young Men

=== Third round ===
In this round entered winners from the Second Round as well as all 17 teams from IFA Championship. The games were played on 13 December 2008.

Team 1	Score	Team 2
Annagh United	0–1	Warrenpoint Town
Armagh City	0–2	Banbridge Town
Ballyclare Comrades	4–1	Newbuildings United
Carrick Rangers	5–0	Drumaness Mills
Coagh United	2–3	Portstewart
Crumlin United	0–2	Ballymoney United
Dergview	3–2	Dunmurry Rec.
Donegal Celtic	3–0	Kilmore Recreation
Dromara Village	1–3	Ballinamallard United
Glebe Rangers	0–2	Newington Youth Club
Hanover	1–5	Downpatrick
Killymoon Rangers	0–2	Killyleagh Youth
Larne	3–1	Dollingstown
Limavady United	5–1	Lurgan Celtic
Loughgall	5–0	Nortel
Malachians	1–2	Ards
Portadown	5–2	Dundela
PSNI	6–3	Newcastle
Tobermore United	3–2	Queen's University
Wellington Recreation	0–3	Islandmagee

=== Fourth round ===
In this round entered winners from the Third Round as well as all 12 teams from IFA Premiership. The games were played on 17 January 2009.

Team 1	Score	Team 2
Ballinamallard United	0–1	Donegal Celtic
Ballyclare Comrades	0–2	Ballymena United
Banbridge Town	0–3	Lisburn Distillery
Bangor	1–1	Carrick Rangers
Cliftonville	3–1	Warrenpoint Town
Coleraine	3–0	Ards
Crusaders	1–0	Ballymoney United
Dungannon Swifts	7–2	Downpatrick
Glenavon	3–1	Newington Youth Club
Glentoran	3–0	Limavady United
Islandmagee	0–3	Institute
Larne	1–3	Loughgall
Linfield	0–0	PSNI
Newry City	8–0	Portstewart
Portadown	8–1	Dergview
Tobermore United	4–1	Killyleagh Youth

==== Replays ====
Team 1	Score	Team 2
Carrick Rangers	1–5	Bangor
Linfield	3–0	PSNI

=== Fifth round ===
In this round entered the sixteen winners from the Fourth Round. The matches were played on 14 February 2009.

Team 1	Score	Team 2
Ballymena United	0–1	Crusaders
Cliftonville	2–0	Donegal Celtic
Glenavon	1–3	Linfield
Glentoran	2–1	Coleraine
Institute	1–0	Dungannon Swifts
Lisburn Distillery	1–0	Tobermore United
Newry City	1–0	Bangor
Portadown	5–0	Loughgall

=== Quarter-finals ===
7 March 2009
15:00 UTC

Glentoran	0 – 1	Cliftonville
	Report	Scannell 20'

The Oval, Belfast

7 March 2009
15:00 UTC

Institute	2 – 1	Newry City
Friars 27'; Brown 86'	Report	Morgan 14'

YMCA Grounds, Drumahoe

7 March 2009
15:00 UTC

Linfield	3 – 0	Lisburn Distillery
Ferguson 49' 67'; McAreavey 80'	Report

Windsor Park, Belfast

7 March 2009
15:00 UTC

Portadown	2 – 5	Crusaders
Mouncey 42'; Baker 85'	Report	Donnelly 37'; Smyth 46'; Rainey 57'; Owens 70'; Arthurs 90+2'

Shamrock Park, Portadown

=== Semi-finals ===
4 April 2009
13:05 BST

Cliftonville	0 – 0	Linfield
	Report

The Oval, Belfast

4 April 2009
15:00 BST

Crusaders	4 – 1	Institute
Owens 9'; Doherty 11'; Black 33'; McLaughlin 79' (o.g.)	Report	Ramsey 64' (pen.)

Ballymena Showgrounds, Ballymena

==== Replay ====
21 April 2009
19:45 BST

Cliftonville	3 – 2	Linfield
Scannell 20' (pen.) 90+3'; Donaghy 90+4'	Report	Munster 32'; Garrett 76'

The Oval, Belfast

=== Final ===
9 May 2009
14:30 BST

Cliftonville	0 – 1	Crusaders
	Report	Dickson 47'

Windsor Park, Belfast
Attendance: 7,500
Referee: Adrian McCourt
