= 1994–95 Irish Cup =

Tournament details
- Country: Northern Ireland
- Teams: 93

Final positions
- Champions: Linfield (35th win)
- Runners-up: Carrick Rangers

Tournament statistics
- Matches played: 110
- Goals scored: 395 (3.59 per match)

The 1994–95 Irish Cup was the 115th edition of the Irish Cup, Northern Ireland's premier football knock-out cup competition. It concluded on 6 May 1995 with the final.

Linfield were the defending champions after winning their 34th Irish Cup last season, with a 2–0 win over Bangor in the 1994 final. They retained the trophy with a 3–1 win over Carrick Rangers in the final this season, to win it for the 35th time.

This was the last final to be played at The Oval for 20 years, until 2015, when the redevelopment of Windsor Park meant that the final had to be played elsewhere.

== Results ==
=== First round ===
The following teams were given byes into the second round: 1st Bangor Old Boys, Barn United, Dromara Village, Dromore Amateurs, Larne Tech Old Boys, Malachians, Northern Telecom, Portstewart, Queen's University, Roe Valley and Saintfield United.

Team 1	Score	Team 2
1st Shankill NISC	8–0	Bangor Amateurs
Ards Rangers	4–0	Downshire Young Men
Armoy United	1–1	East Belfast
Bessbrook United	3–0	Magherafelt Sky Blues
Bridgend United	0–1	Ballymacash Rangers
Civil Service	0–0	Islandmagee
Cullybackey	4–5	Abbey Villa
Dungiven Celtic	4–0	Ballynahinch United
ECC	5–0	Richhill
Glebe Rangers	8–1	Portglenone
Hanover	0–2	1st Liverpool
Harland & Wolff Welders	2–0	Donard Hospital
Institute	5–0	Drummond United
Killyleagh Youth	1–4	Cookstown Royals
Killymoon Rangers	0–2	UUC
Orangefield Old Boys	3–0	Laurelvale
Oxford United Stars	w/o	Connor
Seapatrick	0–3	Comber Recreation
Shorts	7–1	Harland & Wolff Sports
Southend United	0–3	Sirocco Works
UUJ	2–2	Rathfriland Rangers

==== Replays ====
Team 1	Score	Team 2
East Belfast	2–3	Armoy United
Islandmagee	2–0	Civil Service
Rathfriland Rangers	3–2	UUJ

=== Second round ===
Team 1	Score	Team 2
1st Bangor Old Boys	1–1	Queen's University
Abbey Villa	0–2	1st Shankill NISC
Bessbrook United	4–2	Orangefield Old Boys
Cookstown Royals	4–0	Shorts
Dromara Village	3–0	Saintfield United
Dromore Amateurs	2–3	Armoy United
Dungiven Celtic	4–0	Malachians
ECC	0–8	Comber Recreation
Glebe Rangers	2–3	Barn United
Harland & Wolff Welders	4–0	Portstewart
Institute	1–0	Oxford United Stars
Islandmagee	2–2	Ards Rangers
Northern Telecom	3–1	1st Liverpool
Rathfriland Rangers	4–2	Ballymacash Rangers
Roe Valley	4–1	Larne Tech Old Boys
Sirocco Works	0–0	UUC

==== Replays ====
Team 1	Score	Team 2
Ards Rangers	2–6	Islandmagee
Queen's University	3–1	1st Bangor Old Boys
UUC	2–0	Sirocco Works

=== Third round ===
Team 1	Score	Team 2
1st Shankill NISC	1–2	Comber Recreation
Barn United	1–4	Institute
Bessbrook United	1–2	Roe Valley
Dungiven Celtic	1–0	Dromara Village
Harland & Wolff Welders	2–1	Northern Telecom
Islandmagee	1–3	Queen's University
Rathfriland Rangers	0–1	Cookstown Royals
UUC	2–4	Armoy United

=== Fourth round ===
Team 1	Score	Team 2
Armagh City	2–2	Dungannon Swifts
Ballinamallard United	2–2	Roe Valley
Ballymoney United	1–3	Dungiven Celtic
Banbridge Town	1–0	Coagh United
Brantwood	5–0	Drumaness Mills
Crewe United	6–0	Cookstown Royals
Crumlin United	6–3	Institute
Donegal Celtic	2–0	Queen's University
Dundela	2–0	Park
Dunmurry Recreation	4–0	Armoy United
FC Enkalon	1–1	Cookstown United
Kilmore Recreation	4–1	British Telecom
Limavady United	3–0	Harland & Wolff Welders
Loughgall	3–1	Comber Recreation
RUC	2–2	Moyola Park
Tobermore United	1–3	Chimney Corner

==== Replays ====
Team 1	Score	Team 2
Ballinamallard United	3–3 (a.e.t.) (5–4 p)	Roe Valley
Cookstown United	3–0	FC Enkalon
Dungannon Swifts	3–0	Armagh City
Moyola Park	2–0	RUC

=== Fifth round ===
Team 1	Score	Team 2
Ards	3–1	Chimney Corner
Ballyclare Comrades	2–3	Glenavon
Banbridge Town	7–0	Dunmurry Rec
Brantwood	2–2	Moyola Park
Carrick Rangers	2–0	Ballinamallard United
Crewe United	0–2	Cliftonville
Distillery	1–5	Bangor
Dundela	3–1	Crumlin United
Dungannon Swifts	1–0	Cookstown United
Glentoran	1–1	Coleraine
Limavady United	1–2	Dungiven
Linfield	2–0	Crusaders
Loughgall	2–1	Kilmore Rec
Newry Town	3–0	Larne
Omagh Town	0–0	Ballymena United
Portadown	4–0	Donegal Celtic

==== Replays ====
Team 1	Score	Team 2
Ballymena United	0–1	Omagh Town
Coleraine	2–1	Glentoran
Moyola Park	2–3	Brantwood

=== Sixth round ===
Team 1	Score	Team 2
Ards	4–1	Brantwood
Carrick Rangers	2–1	Dundela
Cliftonville	4–0	Banbridge Town
Coleraine	0–0	Portadown
Dungannon Swifts	3–5	Linfield
Loughgall	2–1	Dungiven
Newry Town	1–1	Bangor
Omagh Town	1–1	Glenavon

==== Replays ====
Team 1	Score	Team 2
Omagh Town	2–1	Newry Town
Glenavon	3–1	Omagh Town
Portadown	3–1	Coleraine

=== Quarter-finals ===
Team 1	Score	Team 2
Ards	3–2	Glenavon
Carrick Rangers	2–1	Bangor
Linfield	1–1	Loughgall
Portadown	1–1	Cliftonville

==== Replays ====
Team 1	Score	Team 2
Cliftonville	0–1	Portadown
Loughgall	0–1 (a.e.t.)	Linfield

=== Semi-finals ===
Team 1	Score	Team 2
Carrick Rangers	1–0	Portadown
Linfield	0–0	Ards

==== Replay ====
Team 1	Score	Team 2
Ards	1–2	Linfield

=== Final ===
6 May 1995

Carrick Rangers	1 – 3	Linfield
Gilmore 40'	Report	Haylock 18', 56'; McCoosh 85'

The Oval, Belfast
Referee: George Keatley
