= 2002–03 Irish Cup =

Tournament details
- Country: Northern Ireland
- Teams: 77

Final positions
- Champions: Coleraine (5th win)
- Runners-up: Glentoran

Tournament statistics
- Matches played: 93
- Goals scored: 398 (4.28 per match)

The 2002–03 Irish Cup was the 123rd edition of the Irish Cup, Northern Ireland's premier football knock-out cup competition. It concluded on 3 May 2003 with the final.

Linfield were the defending champions, winning their 36th Irish Cup last season after a 2–1 win over Portadown in the 2002 final. This season Linfield reached the quarter-finals, but went out to Omagh Town. Coleraine were the eventual winners, in what was their first appearance in the final in 17 years. The last time they had done so was in 1986, when they were defeated 2–1 by Glentoran. It was the same opposition but a different outcome this time. A 1–0 victory over the Glens, who were appearing in the final for the fifth time in eight years, was enough to seal Coleraine's first Irish Cup win in 26 years. The last time they had won the competition was in 1977.

== Results ==
=== First round ===
Team 1	Score	Team 2
1st Bangor Old Boys	2–1 (a.e.t.)	Orangefield Old Boys
Abbey Villa	2–2 (a.e.t.) (5–3 p)	Ballymacash Rangers
Albert Foundry	1–2	Drummond United
Downshire Young Men	0–5	Larne Tech Old Boys
Draperstown Celtic	3–1	Lower Maze
Dromore Amateurs	1–2	Oxford United Stars
Dungiven Celtic	5–0	Donard Hospital
Grove United	4–6	Annagh United
Islandmagee	3–3 (a.e.t.) (8–7 p)	Glebe Rangers
Laurelvale	8–2	Desertmartin
Malachians	4–1	Barn United
Newington	w/o	Dundonald
Portadown BBOB	2–4	Roe Valley
Richhill	1–6	Nortel
Saintfield United	5–1	Hanover
Seagoe	1–1 (a.e.t.) (3–1 p)	Wellington Recreation
Sperrin Olympic	2–4	Magherafelt Sky Blues
Tandragee Rovers	8–6 (a.e.t.)	Shorts
UUC	0–3	Sirocco Works
Warrenpoint Town	0–1	Wakehurst

=== Second round ===
Team 1	Score	Team 2
Annagh United	2–5	Bangor Amateurs
Ballycastle United	2–3 (a.e.t.)	1st Bangor Old Boys
Ballynahinch United	2–8	Dungiven Celtic
Draperstown Celtic	2–3	Laurelvale
Drummond United	1–7	Queen's University
Islandmagee	1–2	Seagoe
Magherafelt Sky Blues	1–5	Tandragee Rovers
Nortel	2–3	Larne Tech Old Boys
Oxford United Stars	1–0	Newington
Sirocco Works	2–1	Roe Valley
Wakehurst	1–3	Malachians

=== Third round ===
Team 1	Score	Team 2
Comber Recreation	4–5	Tandragee Rovers
Dunmurry Recreation	2–4	Ballymoney United
Knockbreda Parish	2–1	Larne Tech Old Boys
Lurgan Celtic	4–1	East Belfast

=== Third round (A) ===
Team 1	Score	Team 2
Ards Rangers	1–2	Banbridge Town
Ballinamallard United	1–0	Knockbreda Parish
Ballymoney United	7–0	Seagoe
Brantwood	2–1	Queen's University
Chimney Corner	1–2	Dundela
Crumlin United	3–0	Crewe United
Drumaness Mills	0–1	Kilmore Recreation
Donegal Celtic	2–1	Coagh United
Dromara Village	3–1	Kilbride Swifts
Enkalon	3–1	Bangor Amateurs
Harland & Wolff Welders	4–3	Abbey Villa
Killyleagh Youth	5–2	PSNI
Malachians	4–0	Sirocco Works
Moyola Park	5–1	1st Bangor Old Boys
Portstewart	2–0	Dungiven Celtic
Rathfriland Rangers	1–2	Lurgan Celtic
Saintfield United	w/o	Laurelvale
Tandragee Rovers	2–3	Oxford United Stars

=== Fourth round ===
Team 1	Score	Team 2
Banbridge Town	5–2	Donegal Celtic
Brantwood	2–1	Crumlin United
Dromara Village	2–4	Malachians
Drumaness Mills	0–2	Knockbreda Parish
Enkalon	1–8	Lurgan Celtic
Harland & Wolff Welders	2–1	Ballymoney United
Killyleagh Youth	4–1	Dundela
Laurelvale	1–6	Oxford United Stars
Moyola Park	3–2	Portstewart

=== Fifth round ===
Larne received a bye into the sixth round.

Team 1	Score	Team 2
Armagh City	1–2	Ballyclare Comrades
Ballynure Old Boys	0–3	Limavady United
Carrick Rangers	2–6	Omagh Town
Crusaders	2–0	Lurgan Celtic
Dungannon Swifts	1–0	Institute
Glenavon	4–0	Loughgall
Glentoran	11–0	Oxford United Stars
Harland & Wolff Welders	2–1	Bangor
Killyleagh Youth	2–1	Banbridge Town
Linfield	1–0	Cliftonville
Lisburn Distillery	0–2	Coleraine
Moyola Park	1–2	Ards
Newry Town	1–1	Knockbreda Parish
Portadown	1–1	Ballymena United
Tobermore United	2–0	Brantwood

==== Replays ====
Team 1	Score	Team 2
Knockbreda Parish	2–1	Newry Town
Portadown	6–0	Ballymena United

=== Sixth round ===
Team 1	Score	Team 2
Ards	1–0	Killyleagh Youth
Ballyclare Comrades	0–3	Glentoran
Coleraine	2–0	Larne
Crusaders	1–1	Harland & Wolff Welders
Limavady United	0–3	Glenavon
Omagh Town	1–0	Dungannon Swifts
Portadown	2–0	Knockbreda Parish
Tobermore United	0–2	Linfield

==== Replay ====
Team 1	Score	Team 2
Crusaders	2–1	Harland & Wolff Welders

=== Quarter-finals ===
Team 1	Score	Team 2
Ards	0–1	Glentoran
Coleraine	2–0	Crusaders
Omagh Town	1–0	Linfield
Portadown	5–0	Glenavon

=== Semi-finals ===
Team 1	Score	Team 2
Coleraine	5–2	Omagh Town
Glentoran	6–1	Portadown

=== Final ===
3 May 2003

Coleraine	1 – 0	Glentoran
Tolan 11'	Report

Windsor Park, Belfast
Attendance: 9,000
