= 2001–02 Irish Cup =

Tournament details
- Country: Northern Ireland
- Teams: 85

Final positions
- Champions: Linfield (36th win)
- Runners-up: Portadown

Tournament statistics
- Matches played: 92
- Goals scored: 347 (3.77 per match)

The 2001–02 Irish Cup was the 122nd edition of the Irish Cup, Northern Ireland's premier football knock-out cup competition. It concluded on 11 May 2002 with the final.

Glentoran were the defending champions, winning their second successive Irish Cup last season after a 1–0 win over archrivals Linfield in the 2001 final. This season Linfield went one better, to lift the cup for the 36th time overall and the first time in seven years, with a 2–1 win over Portadown in the final. This was Portadown's second defeat in the final in three years.

== Results ==
=== First round ===
The following teams were given byes into the second round: Abbey Villa, Annagh United, Ballymacash Rangers, Bangor Amateurs, Barn United, Connor, Desertmartin, Donard Hospital, Downshire Young Men, Dromore Amateurs, Hanover, Islandmagee, Larne Tech Old Boys, Nortel, Orangefield Old Boys, Oxford United Stars, Richhill, Saintfield United, Seagoe, Shorts, Tandragee Rovers. Roe Valley were given a bye into the second round (A) and Crewe United were given a bye into the third round.

Team 1	Score	Team 2
Civil Service	2–0	Ballynahinch United
Dungiven Celtic	3–2	Laurelvale
Grove United	1–7	Wakehurst
Harland & Wolff Sports	2–2 (a.e.t.) (1–4 p)	Queen's University
Lower Maze	2–1	Sirocco Works
Magherafelt Sky Blues	2–0	1st Bangor Old Boys
Malachians	5–3	Drummond United

=== Second round ===
Team 1	Score	Team 2
Abbey Villa	2–2 (a.e.t.) (4–2 p)	Dromore Amateurs
Barn United	3–2	Shorts
Civil Service	3–2	Lower Maze
Connor	2–1	Ballymacash Rangers
Desertmartin	0–8	Malachians
Donard Hospital	4–2	Oxford United Stars
Dungiven Celtic	3–0	Downshire Young Men
Islandmagee	2–3	Hanover
Larne Tech Old Boys	4–0	Annagh United
Nortel	1–3	Queen's University
Richhill	1–5	Orangefield Old Boys
Saintfield United	5–2	Magherafelt Sky Blues
Seagoe	1–3	Tandragee Rovers
Wakehurst	8–0	Bangor Amateurs

=== Second round (A) ===
Team 1	Score	Team 2
Roe Valley	1–3	Malachians

=== Third round ===
Team 1	Score	Team 2
Abbey Villa	1–0	Hanover
Ards Rangers	2–1	Enkalon
Ballinamallard United	1–0	Knockbreda Parish
Banbridge Town	0–2	Ballymoney United
Brantwood	2–0	Chimney Corner
Coagh United	2–1	Larne Tech Old Boys
Crewe United	3–0	Tandragee Rovers
Crumlin United	1–2	Barn United
Donegal Celtic	2–1	Wakehurst
Dromara Village	4–2	Civil Service
Drumaness Mils	2–2 (a.e.t.) (3–5 p)	Killyleagh Youth
Dundela	3–1	East Belfast
Dunmurry Recreation	3–1	Saintfield United
Kilmore Recreation	2–4	Portstewart
Lurgan Celtic	4–0	Donard Hospital
Malachians	4–0	Connor
Moyola Park	3–0	Comber Recreation
Orangefield Old Boys	0–2	Dungiven Celtic
RUC	1–5	Harland & Wolff Welders
Rathfriland Rangers	2–0	Queen's University

=== Fourth round ===
Team 1	Score	Team 2
Ards Rangers	2–1	Harland & Wolff Welders
Ballinamallard United	2–1	Malachians
Ballymoney United	2–5	Killyleagh Youth
Brantwood	5–3	Rathfriland Rangers
Coagh United	0–2	Dunmurry Recreation
Crewe United	1–2	Barn United
Donegal Celtic	3–2	Abbey Villa
Dromara Village	1–2	Lurgan Celtic
Moyola Park	2–1	Dungiven Celtic
Portstewart	3–2	Dundela

=== Fifth round ===
Team 1	Score	Team 2
Armagh City	2–5	Dungannon Swifts
Ballyclare Comrades	4–1	Barn United
Bangor	0–2	Crusaders
Brantwood	1–1	Moyola Park
Carrick Rangers	4–3	Lisburn Distillery
Cliftonville	1–1	Portadown
Coleraine	5–3	Donegal Celtic
Glenavon	0–0	Lurgan Celtic
Glentoran	1–0	Newry Town
Institute	4–1	Ards Rangers
Killyleagh Youth	4–1	Ballinamallard United
Limavady United	1–2	Ards
Linfield	3–0	Portstewart
Loughgall	2–2	Larne
Omagh Town	0–0	Ballymena United
Tobermore United	1–2	Dunmurry Recreation

==== Replays ====
Team 1	Score	Team 2
Ballymena United	1–0	Omagh Town
Glenavon	1–1 (a.e.t.) (3–2 p)	Lurgan Celtic
Larne	1–1 (a.e.t.) (4–2 p)	Loughgall
Moyola Park	1–0 (a.e.t.)	Brantwood
Portadown	2–1	Cliftonville

=== Sixth round ===
Team 1	Score	Team 2
Ards	0–5	Glentoran
Ballyclare Comrades	3–1	Dunmurry Recreation
Ballymena United	0–3	Glenavon
Carrick Rangers	0–7	Linfield
Crusaders	1–1	Dungannon Swifts
Larne	0–0	Killyleagh Youth
Moyola Park	3–3	Coleraine
Portadown	3–1	Institute

==== Replays ====
Team 1	Score	Team 2
Coleraine	5–1	Moyola Park
Dungannon Swifts	1–0	Crusaders
Larne	1–2	Killyleagh Youth

=== Quarter-finals ===
Team 1	Score	Team 2
Coleraine	2–0	Dungannon Swifts
Glentoran	1–1	Portadown
Killyleagh Youth	1–0	Ballyclare Comrades
Linfield	3–0	Glenavon

==== Replay ====
Team 1	Score	Team 2
Portadown	4–3	Glentoran

=== Semi-finals ===
Team 1	Score	Team 2
Linfield	4–0	Killyleagh Youth
Portadown	2–0	Coleraine

=== Final ===
11 May 2002

Linfield	2 – 1	Portadown
Morgan 14', 22'	Report	Neill 6'

Windsor Park, Belfast
Attendance: 11,129
