= MPFC =

MPFC or mPFC may refer to:

- Medial prefrontal cortex
- Monty Python's Flying Circus
- Moyola Park F.C.
