= Oxford United (disambiguation) =

Oxford United may refer to:

- Oxford United F.C., an English men’s association football club
- Oxford United Ladies F.C., an English women’s association football club
- Oxford United Stars F.C., a Northern Irish men's association football club in the Intermediate League
- Oxford Sunnyside F.C., an association football club in the Mid-Ulster Football League formerly used the name Oxford United F.C.
