= CYFC =

CYFC may refer to:

- Changchun Yatai F.C., a Chinese football club
- Christian Youth FC, former name of Wellington Olympic AFC
- Cookstown Youth F.C., a Northern Irish football club
- Fredericton International Airport, an airport in New Brunswick, Canada, with the ICAO code CYFC

== See also ==
- St. Patrick's C.Y.F.C.
