= Craig Memorial Cup =

- Organiser(s): North West of Ireland Football Association
- Founded: 1980
- Region: Northern Ireland
- Current champions: Limavady United (2023–24)
- Most championships: Limavady United (10 titles)

The Craig Memorial Cup, also known as the William Craig Memorial Cup, is an intermediate football competition in Northern Ireland run by the North West of Ireland Football Association. The competition culminates in the final which has traditionally been played on Boxing Day. The current champions are Limavady United.

== Past winners ==
- 1980–81 Tobermore United
- 1981–82 Moyola Park
- 1982–83 Roe Valley
- 1983–84 Dungiven
- 1984–85 Coleraine Reserves
- 1985–86 Portstewart
- 1986–87 Coleraine Reserves
- 1987–88 Strabane
- 1988–89 Tobermore United
- 1989–90 Tobermore United
- 1990–91 Macosquin
- 1991–92 Park
- 1992–93 Limavady United
- 1993–94 Limavady United
- 1994–95 Limavady United
- 1995–96 Oxford United Stars
- 1996–97 Drummond United
- 1997–98 Tobermore United
- 1998–99 Institute
- 1999–00 Drummond United
- 2000–01 Moyola Park
- 2001–02 Moyola Park
- 2002–03 Moyola Park
- 2003–04 Strabane
- 2004–05 Moyola Park
- 2005–06 Moyola Park
- 2006–07 Tobermore United
- 2007–08 Portstewart
- 2008–09 Limavady United
- 2009–10 Tobermore United
- 2010–11 Limavady United
- 2011–12 Institute
- 2012–13 Limavady United
- 2013–14 Coleraine Reserves
- 2014–15 Limavady United
- 2015–16 Limavady United
- 2016–17 Limavady United
- 2017–18 Maiden City
- 2018–19 Maiden City
- 2019–20 Portstewart
- 2020–21 Not played
- 2021–22 Portstewart
- 2022–23 Maiden City
- 2023–24 Limavady United
- 2024–25 Newtowne
- 2025–26 Desertmartin

== Performance by club ==
Team	No. of wins	Winning years
Limavady United	10	1992–93, 1993–94, 1994–95, 2008–09, 2010–11, 2012–13, 2014–15, 2015–16, 2016–17, 2023–24
Moyola Park	6	1981–82, 2000–01, 2001–02, 2002–03, 2004–05, 2005–06
Tobermore United	6	1980–81, 1988–89, 1989–90, 1997–98, 2006–07, 2009–10
Portstewart	4	1985–86, 2007–08, 2019-20, 2021-22
Coleraine Reserves	3	1984–85, 1986–87, 2013–14
Maiden City	3	2017–18, 2018–19, 2022-23
Drummond United	2	1996–97, 1999–00
Institute	2	1998–99, 2011–12
Strabane	2	1987–88, 2003–04
Desertmartin	1	2025–26
Dungiven	1	1983–84
Macosquin	1	1990–91
Newtowne	1	2024–25
Oxford United Stars	1	1995–96
Park	1	1991–92
Roe Valley	1	1982–83

== See also ==
- Steel & Sons Cup
- Bob Radcliffe Cup
- Fermanagh & Western Intermediate Cup
- North West Senior Cup
