= Banbridge A.F.C. =

Banbridge
- Full name: Banbridge Association Football Club
- Founded: 1997
- Dissolved: 2014
- Ground: Cheney Park

Banbridge A.F.C. was an intermediate-level football club playing in the Mid-Ulster Football League in Northern Ireland. The club was based in Banbridge. In 2014, the club merged with Banbridge Town.
