= Ballycastle United F.C. =

Association football club in Northern Ireland

Ballycastle United
- Full name: Ballycastle United Football Club
- Ground: Billy Watson Pitch; Ballycastle, County Antrim

Ballycastle United Football Club currently compete in the Coleraine and District Premier League, having formerly played at intermediate-level in the Premier division of the Ballymena & Provincial League in Northern Ireland.
