= Windmill Stars F.C. =

Association football club in County Armagh, Northern Ireland

Windmill Stars
- Full name: Windmill Stars Football Club
- Founded: 1985
- Ground: Willie Davis Park
- Chairman: Keith McCrink
- Manager: Gareth White
- League: Mid-Ulster Football League Intermediate A

Windmill Stars Football Club is a Northern Irish intermediate football club based in Newry, County Down, playing in the Intermediate Division A of the Mid-Ulster Football League. The club's colours are orange and navy. The club, which forms part of the Mid-Ulster Football Association, participates in the Irish Cup. The club reached the first round of the Irish Cup in January 2022, losing to NIFL Premiership side Coleraine by 6–0 at the Showgrounds.

== Honours ==
=== Junior honours ===
- Irish Junior Cup: 1
  - 2002–03
