= Cookstown Royal British Legion F.C. =

Association football club in Northern Ireland

Cookstown RBL
- Full name: Cookstown Royal British Legion Football Club
- League: Ballymena & Provincial Football League
- 2018–19: Ballymena & Provincial Football League, 14th
Home colours

Cookstown Royal British Legion Football Club (Cookstown RBL) is an intermediate-level football club from Cookstown, County Tyrone, in Northern Ireland, playing in the Intermediate Division of the Ballymena & Provincial League. The club is connected to the Royal British Legion branch in the town. The club plays in the Irish Cup.
