= Maiden City F.C. =

Association football club in Northern Ireland

Maiden City
- Full name: Maiden City Football Club
- Ground: Brandywell Stadium
- Manager: Neil Carlin
- League: Northern Ireland Intermediate League
Home colours

Maiden City Football Club is an intermediate football club based in Derry, Northern Ireland, playing in the Northern Ireland Intermediate League. Formerly only a youth football academy, the club was formed in 2016 as a pathway to senior football for players coming through their already prestigious academy. Emphasis at the club is still put on the youth academy and progression of young players, many of whom have progressed into professional football.

In the 2017/18 season, Maiden City won the Craig Memorial Cup, beating Portstewart 2–1 in the final.

The club participates in the Irish Cup, and have reached the fifth round of the 2018 competition, where they were away to Crusaders. They also played in the 3rd round of the Irish Cup against Tullycarnet FC in 2019 and where defeated 3–2.

== Honours ==
- Craig Memorial Cup: 3
  - 2017–18, 2018–19, 2022–23
- NI Intermediate League Cup: 3
  - 2017–18, 2018–19, 2021–22
- NI Intermediate Challenge Cup: 2
  - 2018–19, 2022–23
