= Tullyvallen F.C. =

Soccer club in Northern Ireland

Tullyvallen Rangers
- Full name: Tullyvallen Rangers Football Club
- Nickname: Vallen
- Founded: 1986
- Ground: Hillview Park
- Chairman: Johnson Henry
- Manager: Philip McMurdie
- League: Mid-Ulster Football League Intermediate B

Tullyvallen Rangers Football Club is an intermediate-level football club playing in the Intermediate B division of the Mid-Ulster Football League in Northern Ireland. The club, which forms part of the Mid-Ulster Football Association, plays all home games at Hillview Park at Tullyvallen outside Newtownhamilton. The ground was officially opened by Linfield manager David Healy during a pre-season friendly in 2016.
