= Armoy United F.C. =

Association football club in Northern Ireland

Armoy United
- Full name: Armoy United Football Club
- Founded: 1968

Armoy United Football Club was a Northern Irish, intermediate football club, that played in the Northern Ireland Intermediate League, and in the Irish Cup, the club was founded in 1968 and based in Armoy, County Antrim.

== Honours ==
=== Intermediate honours ===
- Steel & Sons Cup: 1
  - 1977-78
