= Strabane F.C. =

Strabane
- Full name: Strabane Football Club
- Founded: 1961 merged with Sion Swifts 2010 folded 2012
- Ground: Melvin Sports Complex, Strabane, County Tyrone

Strabane F.C. was a Northern Irish football club from the town of Strabane, County Tyrone. The club was founded in 1961 by John Madden, Billy Harte, John McCrossan, Richard McGinley, Billy Wallace and Eamon McColgan as Strabane F.C.. In 2010 the club merged with Sion Swifts and were known as Strabane and Sion Swifts United but that club folded in 2012.

The club played in the Irish Cup.

== Honours ==
=== Intermediate honours ===
- Craig Memorial Cup: 2
  - 1987–88, 2003–04
