= Cookstown Youth F.C. =

Association football club in Northern Ireland

Cookstown Youth
- Full name: Cookstown Youth Football Club
- Founded: 1991
- League: Ballymena & Provincial Football League
Home colours

Cookstown Youth Football Club is an intermediate-level football club from Cookstown, County Tyrone, in Northern Ireland, playing in the Intermediate Division of the Ballymena & Provincial League. The club was formed in 1991, being one of the only football clubs in the area. It has a number of under-age teams and a senior team. The club plays in the Irish Cup.
