= Northern Ireland Intermediate League =

- Founded: 1978
- Folded: 2023
- Country: Northern Ireland
- Level on pyramid: 4
- Promotion to: NIFL Premier Intermediate League
- Domestic cup(s): Irish Cup; IFA Intermediate Cup
- League cup(s): Northern Ireland Intermediate League Cup
- Most championships: Donegal Celtic (8 titles)

The Northern Ireland Intermediate League was an amateur intermediate league based in the north-west region of Northern Ireland. As one of the leagues in the 4th tier of Northern Irish football, the league champions could be promoted to the NIFL Premier Intermediate League, providing they met the admittance requirements.

In 2023 the league announced that it would cease to exist due to a number of clubs deciding to join other regional leagues within the Northern Ireland football league system.

== Clubs in membership in final season ==
- Ardstraw
- Dungiven Celtic
- Maiden City
- Newbuildings United
- Newtowne
- Strabane Athletic
- Trojans

== Cup competitions ==
- Intermediate Challenge Cup
- Intermediate League Cup

== List of champions ==
- 1978–79 Tobermore United
- 1979–80 Derry City
- 1980–81 Ballymoney United
- 1981–82 Tobermore United
- 1982–83 Ballymoney United
- 1983–84 Derry City
- 1984–85 Portstewart
- 1985–86 Shelbourne
- 1986–87 Oxford United Stars
- 1987–88 Roe Valley
- 1988–89 Oxford United Stars
- 1989–90 Donegal Celtic
- 1990–91 Donegal Celtic
- 1991–92 Park
- 1992–93 Donegal Celtic
- 1993–94 Donegal Celtic
- 1994–95 Donegal Celtic
- 1995–96 Oxford United Stars
- 1996–97 Oxford United Stars
- 1997–98 Oxford United Stars
- 1998–99 Donegal Celtic
- 1999–00 Donegal Celtic
- 2000–01 Lurgan Celtic
- 2001–02 Donegal Celtic
- 2002–03 Dungiven Celtic
- 2003–04 Dungiven Celtic
- 2004–05 U.U.C.
- 2005–06 Dungiven Celtic
- 2006–07 U.U.C.
- 2007–08 Draperstown Celtic
- 2008–09 Dungiven Celtic
- 2009–10 Oxford United Stars
- 2010–11 Newbuildings United
- 2011–12 Newbuildings United
- 2012–13 Newbuildings United
- 2013–14 Oxford United Stars
- 2014–15 Trojans
- 2015–16 Ballymoney United
- 2016–17 Portstewart
- 2017–18 Magherafelt Sky Blues
- 2018–19 Strabane Athletic
- 2021–22 Maiden City
- 2022–23 Newbuildings United

=== Performance by club ===
Team	No. of wins	Winning years
Donegal Celtic	8	1989–90, 1990–91, 1992–93, 1993–94, 1994–95, 1998–99, 1999–00, 2001–02
Oxford United Stars	7	1986–87, 1988–89, 1995–96, 1996–97, 1997–98, 2009–10, 2013–14
Dungiven Celtic	4	2002–03, 2003–04, 2005–06, 2008–09
Newbuildings United	4	2010–11, 2011–12, 2012–13, 2022–23
Ballymoney United	3	1980–81, 1982–83, 2015–16
Derry City	2	1979–80, 1983–84
Portstewart	2	1984–85, 2016–17
Tobermore United	2	1978–79, 1981–82
U.U.C.	2	2004–05, 2006–07
Draperstown Celtic	1	2007–08
Lurgan Celtic	1	2000–01
Maiden City	1	2021–22
Park	1	1991–92
Roe Valley	1	1987–88
Shelbourne	1	1985–86
Strabane Athletic	1	2018–19
Trojans	1	2014–15

== Sources ==
- Malcolm Brodie (ed.), Northern Ireland Soccer Yearbooks 1979/80 to 2008/09.
