= Trojans F.C. =

Trojans YCG
- Full name: Trojans Youth & Community Group
- Nickname: The Blues
- Founded: 1938
- Ground: Oakland Park, Derry, Northern Ireland
- League: Northern Ireland Intermediate League

Trojans Youth and Community Group is an amateur football club based in the Creggan area of Derry, Northern Ireland. As of 2015, the club's senior team was playing in the Northern Ireland Intermediate League. The club, which was founded in 1938 by Edmund Carton, also has a youth development set-up participating in the NIBFA National League and Derry and District Youth Football Association.

== Team ==
=== Senior ===
The senior Trojans team, also known as the 'Trojans Intermediate Team', participates in the Northern Ireland Intermediate League. They play from Trojans' base at Oakland Park in the Creggan Estate.

=== Youth ===
Trojans YCG has a number of youth teams who participate in the under-age leagues of the NIBFA National Youth League and Derry and District Youth Football Association. The club has previously sent youth teams to international tournaments and has contributed a number of players to the Derry and District League Select, which competes in the Foyle Cup.

== Notable players ==
The club has produced a number of players who have gone on to play for Derry City. Notable former players include:

- Kevin Deery
- Gerard Doherty
- Darren Kelly
- Owen Morrison
- James McClean

== Honours ==
- Northern Ireland Intermediate League (1): 2014–15
