= Newbuildings United F.C. =

Association football club in Northern Ireland

Newbuildings United Football Club
- Founded: 1991
- Ground: 4 Duncastle Road, Newbuildings
- League: Ballymena & Provincial League
- 2022-2023: 1st

Newbuildings United Football Club is an intermediate-level football club playing in the Northern Ireland Intermediate League in Northern Ireland. The club is based in Newbuildings, County Londonderry.

== Honours ==
=== Senior honours ===
- North West Senior Cup: 1
  - 2013–14

=== Intermediate honours ===
- Northern Ireland Intermediate League: 3
  - 2010–11, 2011–12, 2012–13
