= Killymoon Rangers F.C. =

Association football club in Northern Ireland

Killymoon Rangers
- Founded: 1971
- Ground: Mid Ulster Sports Arena, Cookstown, County Tyrone
- Capacity: 700
- League: Ballymena & Provincial Football League Division 1
- 2021-22: Ballymena & Provincial Football League Junior Division One, 2nd
Home colours	Away colours

Killymoon Rangers Football Club are a Northern Irish football club that plays in the Ballymena & Provincial League.

Previously playing at Intermediate Level and before that Championship 1 and Championship II of the Irish League (The 2nd and 3rd tier of Irish League Football) within the Northern Ireland Football League. Nicknamed the 'BlueMoon' by supporters, Killymoon Rangers are located in the historic town of Cookstown, County Tyrone. They play their home games at Beechway Pitch or the Mid Ulster Sports Arena, in Cookstown. They were one of the first teams to play on a plastic, 3rd generation pitch in Northern Ireland's top football leagues.

== History ==
Killymoon Rangers were established in 1971 and is the oldest football club in Cookstown by a considerable number of years, with over 50 years of history. Originally formed to play in the Cookstown Street League, Killymoon joined the Mid Ulster Street League soon after. In July 2008 they were promoted to the IFA Championship. The club played in the Belfast Telegraph Championship 1 and Championship II for 6 consecutive seasons.

The first manager of the club was Wilfie McPartland, assisted by Willie Jordan with former Coleraine chairman Sammy Lyle captaining the team.

After spells in the Mid Ulster Intermediate League where they were managed by Rodney Montgomery, Killymoon entered the newly formed IFA Championship in 2008, managed by brothers Michael and Mark Wilson. The club were relegated into Championship 2 after one season, remaining in Championship 2 until 2014, when they were relegated to the Ballymena & Provincial Intermediate League after finishing bottom of Championship 2. At the start of the 2016–17 season, the club withdrew from the Ballymena and Provincial League although in a press statement the committee insisted that the club had not folded and would return to football. It was announced in May 2017 that the club would return to the league for the new season, but in the junior division section where they could rebuild and enjoy some success once again. By May 2018, as the season drew to an end, the team were unbeaten in 16 league games and were beaten finalists in the Canada Trophy cup competition. They went on to win the league, the first senior league title in over 40 years. Unfortunately they narrowly lost out in the cup final, with a 1 nil defeat to Castle Star FC. (The final was played Allen Park, home of Chimney Corner FC) over 200 people attended the Cup Final.

In the 2020/21 and 2021/22 seasons, there was some disruption to fixtures due to COVID-19, but in both seasons Killymoon finished 2nd on both occasions. The first occasion was by goal difference, and the second occasion by 2 points. The club are striving to return to where they were previously, and as things stand (December 2022) Killymoon sit 2nd in the league, with 11 league games left to play.

The club has had several cup runs in the Irish Cup, where they have played Linfield, Glentoran, Crusaders & Portadown on numerous occasions, including an away visit to the national stadium, Windsor Park, home of Linfield and the Northern Ireland national football team. Also prior to entering Championship 1 Killymoon beat Glentoran 2 to 0 in a pre-season friendly when Martin Bogan scored twice, the Glens fielded strikers Gary Hamilton, Michael Halliday and Chris Morgan for the last 30 minutes but failed to beat keeper Gareth Maguire.
