= Roe Valley F.C. =

Junior football club from Northern Ireland

- Full name: Roe Valley Football Club
- Nickname: Valley
- Founded: 1964
- Ground: Killane Road, Limavady, Northern Ireland
- Chairman: Willie kelly
- Manager: Johnny Pearson
- League: North West Division One
- Website: http://www.roevalleyfc.com
Home colours	Away colours

Roe Valley Football Club, based in Limavady, is a junior football club from Northern Ireland. The club has been in existence for sixty years. After many successes in the 1970s and 1980s, the club was held in high regard in footballing circles not only in the North West but also further afield, indeed it was once one of the leading lights in the Northern Ireland Intermediate League. After a period of uncertainty the club reverted to Junior status in 2011 and currently plays in the North West Junior Division One League. The club famously played Linfield F.C. in the 1983 Irish Cup. A successful Mini-Soccer Academy was set up in 2012 with the hope of building a strong club for the local community. Roe Valley FC won the North West Junior Division 2 league 2021/2022. There first trophy in over 34 years.

== History ==
The town of Limavady boasts a footballing history dating back to the late 19th century. Teams such as Alexander F.C. and The Wanderers are the first noted clubs from the area, who would later amalgamate to form Limavady F.C. (name since changed to the present day Limavady United F.C.). As the game became more popular in the area, more teams were being created with sides like Roe Harps and Roe Villa entering the fold, bearing the name of the river which runs through Limavady town.

In 1964, Roe Valley Football club was formed by Gerry McClelland. The club was initially formed as a youth team, whose first season in competitive football saw them play in the Coleraine & District Youth League. Success came instantly as the team managed to win their respective league in their first season. The club then decided to join the North West League, where the club would compete for over a decade. Again, the club won their respective league in their first season competing, this time winning the North West Junior League "B" Section. With this victory, came promotion to the highest league in the association. For the best part of the next decade, Roe Valley F.C. would have unrivaled success, winning five league titles, two City cups and a North West Junior Cup. One of the City cup victories was a unique one, when Roe Valley set a North West record, which is unlikely to be replicated, when two teams from one club competed in the final, which Roe Valley Reserves won 2–1.

By the end of the 1970s, Roe Valley became a founder member of the present day Northern Ireland Intermediate League. The club's Reserve team continued to compete in the top flight of the North West league, which the team won in the 1979/80 season. The first piece of silverware at intermediate level arrived in 1983, when the club won the Craig Memorial Cup. In 1983, the club's most high-profile match to date came in the form of an away Irish Cup tie to Linfield F.C. which the Belfast side won comfortably 5–0. That season also saw a defeat in the final of the North West Senior Cup. The club's reserve side still remained near the top of the league in the North West Junior League, and also claimed the City Cup in 1982/83. More trophies were added at Intermediate level during the eighties, with the club's only Intermediate League Title along with the NI Intermediate League Cup on two occasions. On 26 July 1985 Roe Valley claimed possibly their biggest scalp when they beat the mighty Glentoran F.C. in a friendly 3–2. Another high-profile game the club was involved in came in the 1986/87 season, when the first team were defeated 3–0 by the PSNI F.C., then called the RUC in the IFA Intermediate Cup Final.

The nineties may not have been as successful as the previous two decades, in the regards to trophies, but the club still produced two strong sides. Agonisingly, the club's first team were Runners-Up in the NI Intermediate for three seasons in succession, coming second twice to Donegal Celtic F.C. and once to Oxford United Stars F.C. In the mid nineties, more clubs were created in the Limavady area, which saw the club's Reserve side cease to exist. The club still battled keenly in the NI Intermediate League for the rest of the decade.

After the millennium, Roe Valley still competed in the NI Intermediate League but began gradually to struggle after each season. Player shortage was a major problem for the club. In 2011, the club lost its Intermediate status, and withdrew from football for one season. As part of a rebuilding process, the club was re-established in 2012, with a new committee being appointed to manage and maintain the club. The club re-entered competitive football, joining the Coleraine & District Premier League. The club now once again competes in the North West Junior League after a long absence. In the 2021–22 season the team won the Division 2 title achieving promotion to a very competitive Division 1 for the 2022–23 season.

== Honours ==
=== Intermediate honours ===
- Craig Memorial Cup: 1
  - 1982–83
- Northern Ireland Intermediate League: 1
  - 1987–88
- Northern Ireland Intermediate League Cup: 2
  - 1983–84, 1986–87

=== Junior honours ===
- North West Junior League Division 1: 5
  - 1970-71, 1974–75, 1975–76, 1976–77, 1979-80 (Reserves)
- North West Junior League 'B' Section: 2
  - 1965-66, 1977-78 (Reserves)
- North West Junior League Division 2: 1
  - 2021-22
- North West F.A. Junior Cup: 2
  - 1974-75, 1982/83 (Reserves)
- North West Junior City Cup: 2
  - 1973-74, 1974-75 (Reserves)
