= Portstewart F.C. =

Association football club in Northern Ireland

Portstewart
- Full name: Portstewart Football Club
- Nickname: The Seahawks
- Founded: 1968
- Ground: The R Kings Competitions Stadium, St John's Close, Portstewart, County Londonderry, Northern Ireland
- Capacity: 1,500
- Chairman: Alan Dempsey
- Manager: David McDaid
- League: NCL Premier
- 2025–26: NIFL Premier Intermediate League, 7th of 14
- Website: https://portstewartfootballclub.co.uk
Home colours	Away colours

Portstewart Football Club is an intermediate, Northern Irish football club from Portstewart, County Londonderry. Founded in 1968, as of 2026 the club was playing in the NCL Premier. The club's main colours are sky blue and navy. Portstewart are nicknamed "The Seahawks". Portstewart Olympic play in the Coleraine and District Morning League. In 2019, the club introduced an Under 20s team, to play in the Championship/PIL Development League.

== History ==
Although there are records of teams playing under the name of Portstewart as early as 1926, Portstewart Football Club was founded in 1968, to play in the Castlerock and Coleraine District League afternoon section. The new club won the league and the Doherty Cup in their debut season. The next season, the club progressed into the North West League Division 2 and earned promotion to the North West Division 1.

In 1979, Portstewart applied to join the Northern Ireland Intermediate League (NIIL). The most defining moment in the club's history came when they appointed Frankie Moffatt, for the first of two spells, as manager in 1984. Moffatt delivered the league title in his first year in charge and followed this up with success in the NIIL Challenge Cup and NIIL League Cup. Following spells at Ballymoney United and then Coleraine, Moffatt returned as manager in 1991.

Portstewart created history in 1994, when they defeated Limavady Utd 1–0 in the William Youngers Intermediate Cup final, becoming the first junior team in over 100 years of the competition to lift the trophy. In 2003, Portstewart were accepted into newly created Irish league Division 2.

Moffatt's decision to step down as manager resulted in his assistant Trevor McKendry taking charge of team affairs. McKendry led the team to the North West Cup final in 2004 when they were narrowly defeated by Tobermore United. In the 2005/06 season, when Portstewart gained promotion to second tier of Irish League football for the first time in the club's history. Portstewart won the 2007/08 Craig Memorial Cup beating Tobermore United, 2–1.

In 2016, the club was relegated from the Northern Ireland Football League, but was promoted back after one season. The 2016/17 season saw Portstewart win the Northern Ireland Intermediate League, Intermediate Challenge Cup and Intermediate League Cup. The club also reached the fifth round of the Irish Cup where they got defeated by Glenavon.

In the 2017/18 season, Portstewart reached the final of Craig Memorial Cup, losing 2–1 to Maiden City. On 17 July 2018, the club announced the resignation of long-serving manager and former captain, Gary Taylor. 3 days later, Johnny Law was appointed as the new manager.

During the 2018/19 season, a match between Portstewart and Sport & Leisure Swifts was abandoned after 70 minutes when a fan joined a "mass brawl" between players and coaches. Further controversy followed when Portstewart lost their place in the Irish Intermediate Cup final, following a protest from Queen's University about the eligibility of one of Portstewart's players.

Portstewart beat Moyola Park 1–0, to win the 2019 Craig Memorial Cup. The 2019/20 season was disrupted in March by the COVID-19 pandemic, with the club still unbeaten in the league and sitting 2nd after 14 games.

== Stadium ==
The club's home ground, Mullaghacall, was officially opened in 1997 by Harry Gregg MBE. A revamp in the Irish league saw a number of clubs demoted in 2008 into an interim league until ground improvements were completed. A new stand was built at Mullaghacall in 2009 and the club once again entered into the reformed Irish league. The Mullaghacall ground has regularly hosted games in the SuperCupNI youth tournament. In July 2025 the club announced a partnership with R Kings Competitions to become the main sponsor and take the naming rights to the ground, with the ground becoming The R Kings Competitions Stadium.

== Honours ==
=== Intermediate honours ===
- Irish Intermediate Cup: 1
  - 1993–94
- IFA Intermediate Second Division: 1
  - 2005–06
- Craig Memorial Cup: 4
  - 1985–86, 2007–08, 2019–20, 2021–22
- Northern Ireland Intermediate League: 2
  - 1984–85, 2016–17
- Intermediate Challenge Cup: 1
  - 2016–17
- Intermediate League Cup: 1
  - 2016–17
