= Moyola Park F.C. =

Association football club in Northern Ireland

Moyola Park
- Full name: Moyola Park Association Football Club
- Nickname: The Park
- Founded: 1880
- Ground: Mill Meadow, Castledawson
- Chairman: David Speirs
- Manager: Martin Smith
- League: NIFL Championship
- 2025–26: NIFL Premier Intermediate League, 1st of 14 (champions; promoted)
Home colours	Away colours

Moyola Park Association Football Club is a semi-professional, Northern Irish football club playing in the NIFL Championship. The club, founded in 1880, hails from Castledawson, near Magherafelt, County Londonderry, and plays its home matches at Mill Meadow. Club colours are royal blue and yellow. The club won the inaugural Irish Cup in 1881. The club is managed by Martin Smith.

== History ==
Moyola Park was formed during season 1879–80 under the patronage of Lord Spencer Chichester, the landlord of the Moyola Park estate. The first recorded game was a friendly at home against Cliftonville, on 14 February 1880, in which the visitors recorded a 3–0 victory. Lord Spencer Chichester was the inaugural president of the Irish Football Association, which was formed in November 1880. On 9 April 1881, Moyola Park became the first winners of the Irish Cup, defeating Cliftonville 1–0 in the final.

After those prestigious early days the club became less prominent and did not become a senior club, playing as a junior club outside the Irish League. In the early years of the twentieth century, the club played in the South Derry District League and it continued to do so until the Second World War, with the exception of the 1929–30 season during which the club participated in the Belfast-based Minor League. After the war, Moyola Park was a founding member of the Ballymena and District Junior League in 1948–49, where it played until season 1977–78 (with the exception of 1950–51, when it participated in the Irish Football Alliance). During this time, the club won the league championship outright on five occasions: 1948–49, 1949–50, 1973–74, 1976–77, 1977–78, and shared the championship in 1959–60 with Ballymoney United. The club also won the Irish Junior Cup in 1972–73 and 1973–74 and was also runner-up the following year. During the 1970s the club was managed by a local ex footballer Billy Lennox with another local ex footballer Johnston Mawhinney Jnr. as his assistant when the aforementioned 3 league titles and 2 Irish Junior Cups were achieved representing notable success in that period of the club's history.

In 1978, the club was elevated to intermediate status upon joining the newly established Northern Ireland Intermediate League. In 1991, Moyola Park gained admission to the Irish League B Division. A successful spell under manager Kenny Shiels saw the club win the Smirnoff Cup (1999–2000) and the Craig Memorial Cup (2000–01), and finished as runners-up in the (renamed) Second Division (2000–01) and Irish Intermediate Cup. The club's greatest modern success followed in 2001–02 when, under new manager Eric Halliday, Moyola Park won the Second Division title (as well as retaining the Craig Memorial Cup.

Until the 2008–09 season, its home was the eponymous Moyola Park, but at the start of 2009–10 it used Coagh United's Hagan Park while its then current ground was under construction. The first match at the new ground was on 16 January 2010 against Lurgan Celtic.

In the 2025–26 season, Moyola Park became the champion of the NIFL Premier Intermediate League and were promoted to the NIFL Championship, the second tier in Northern Irish football.

== Current squad ==
Note: Flags indicate national team as defined under FIFA eligibility rules; some limited exceptions apply. Players may hold more than one non-FIFA nationality.

No.	Pos.	Nation	Player
1	GK	NIR	Andy Findlay
2	DF	NIR	Cead McGrath (on loan from Coleraine)
3	DF	NIR	Brendan Hamilton
4	DF	NIR	Robert McLean
5	DF	NIR	Odhrán McCart
6	DF	NIR	Michael Ruddy (captain)
8	MF	NIR	Conall Houston
9	FW	NIR	David Parkhouse
10	FW	NIR	Kenny Kane
11	FW	NIR	Lee Harkin
12	FW	NIR	Jack Berry
13	GK	NIR	Ray Kelly
14	DF	NIR	Adam Gray
15	MF	NIR	Paddy McLaughlin

No.	Pos.	Nation	Player
16	DF	NIR	Niall Fielding
17	FW	NIR	Jonny Doyle
18	MF	NIR	Callum McCay
19	DF	NIR	Bobby Deane
20	FW	NIR	Luca Doherty
21	DF	NIR	Jake Wallace
24	DF	DOM	Enmy Beltre
26	FW	NIR	Joe McCready
28	MF	NIR	Aidan Tejada
42	MF	NIR	Josh Carson
—	GK	NIR	Dwayne Nelson
—	DF	NIR	Charlie Campbell
—	FW	NIR	Caiolan Brennan

== Honours ==
=== Senior honours ===
- Irish Cup: 1
  - 1880–81

=== Intermediate honours ===
- Irish League Second Division / NIFL Premier Intermediate League: 2
  - 2001–02, 2025–26
- B Division Knock-out Cup: 1
  - 1999–2000
- Craig Memorial Cup: 6
  - 1981–82, 2000–01, 2001–02, 2002–03, 2004–05, 2006–07

=== Junior honours ===
- Irish Junior Cup: 2
  - 1972–73, 1973–74
- Ballymena and District Junior League: 6
  - 1948–49, 1949–50, 1959–60 (shared with Ballymoney United), 1973–74, 1976–77, 1977–78
