= Barn United F.C. =

Association football club in Northern Ireland

Barn United
- Full name: Barn United Football Club
- Ground: Haslett Park, Carrickfergus
- League: NAFL Division 1B
- 2023-24: NAFL Division 1B, 14th
Home colours

Barn United Football Club is a Northern Ireland, intermediate football club from Carrickfergus, Northern Ireland playing in Division 1B of the Northern Amateur Football League. They play their home games at Haslett Park, next door to their local rivals Carrick Rangers. The current club formed in 1954 taking its name from an earlier team, Barn, which played in the Irish League from 1923 to 1928. As well as Barn's first XI, they field a second team in the Amateur League Division 3B and several youth teams in the East Antrim Youth League.

== History ==
When Barn United formed in 1954, the club set up its home ground adjacent to Carrick Rangers' Taylor Avenue home. United joined the Northern Amateur League as a junior club in 1955, before being elevated to intermediate status in 1961. The two clubs shared a friendly rivalry up to the 1970s and both performed well. But in 1976, Carrick shocked the senior Irish clubs when they won the Irish Cup. By 1983, Carrick was playing senior football.

Barn United found new rivals in Islandmagee with the teams meeting annually to play for a trophy. But the fixture was marred by a series of on-field incidents and trouble between the opposing fans. The teams still meet in league and cup matches but the trophy matches are no longer played.

The club's current facilities at Haslett Park are basic but does feature a social club, which was opened in 1981 by Rangers player and Northern Ireland international John McClelland. There is also a covered stand called the Gary "Gee" McKee stand which can seat 70 fans. Barn fans often refer to themselves as "barnies" or "barnyarts".

== Honours ==
=== Intermediate honours ===
- Northern Amateur League: 1
  - 1975–76
- Clarence Cup: 2
  - 1975–76, 1994–95
