= Dromara Village F.C. =

Association football club in Northern Ireland

Dromara Village
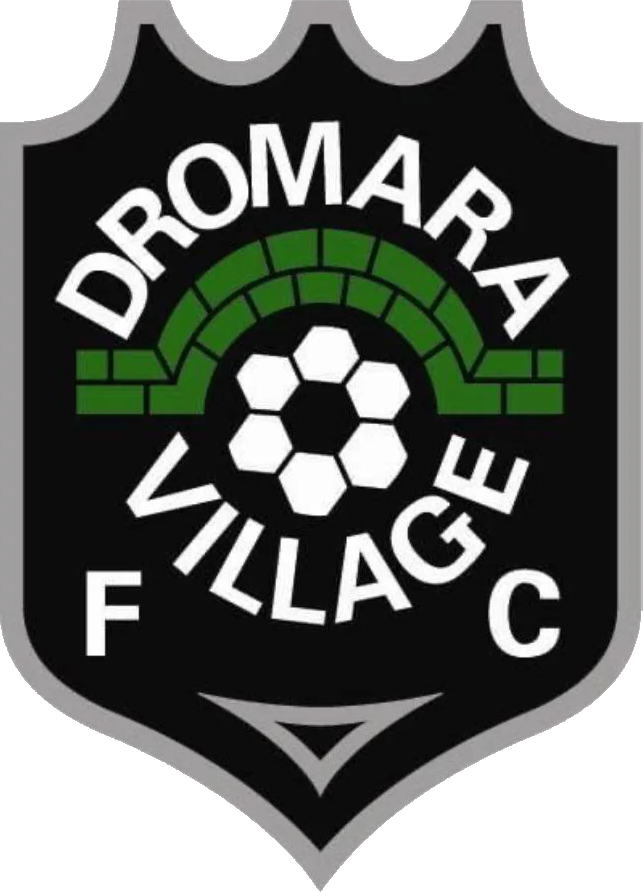
- Full name: Dromara Village Football Club
- Founded: 1976
- Ground: Bellsbridge, Dromara
- Chairman: John Owens
- League: NAFL Premier Division

Dromara Village Football Club is a Northern Irish intermediate football club based in Dromara who currently play in the Premier Division of the Northern Amateur Football League. The club has three senior teams playing in the Amateur League and the Newcastle and District League, and one under-17 youth team competing in the Lisburn Invitational League. The club joined the Newcastle and District League in 1976, and gained intermediate status upon entry to Division 1C of the Amateur League in 1986. The biggest achievement for the club in recent years was promotion to the Premier Division of the Amateur Premier League at the end of the 2007–08 season. In latter history one of the big highlights for the club was reaching the Steel & Sons cup final in 1996 when the Villagers were narrowly defeated in a cup final replay, having drawn the first tie against Ballymena United Reserves. Dromara returned to the amateur Premier Division after a record breaking 2022–23 season which saw them promoted as 1A champions.

They play their football at Bellsbridge, just outside Dromara, which boasts some of the best facilities in the Amateur League, consisting of two well kept full size playing pitches, one full size training pitch, a club house and a small grandstand for spectators.

== Honours ==
=== Intermediate honours ===
- Border Cup: 1
  - 2010–11
- NAFL 1A 2022–23
