= Harland & Wolff Welders F.C. =

Association football club in Northern Ireland

Coordinates: 54°36′59.2″N 5°51′50.1″W

Harland & Wolff Welders
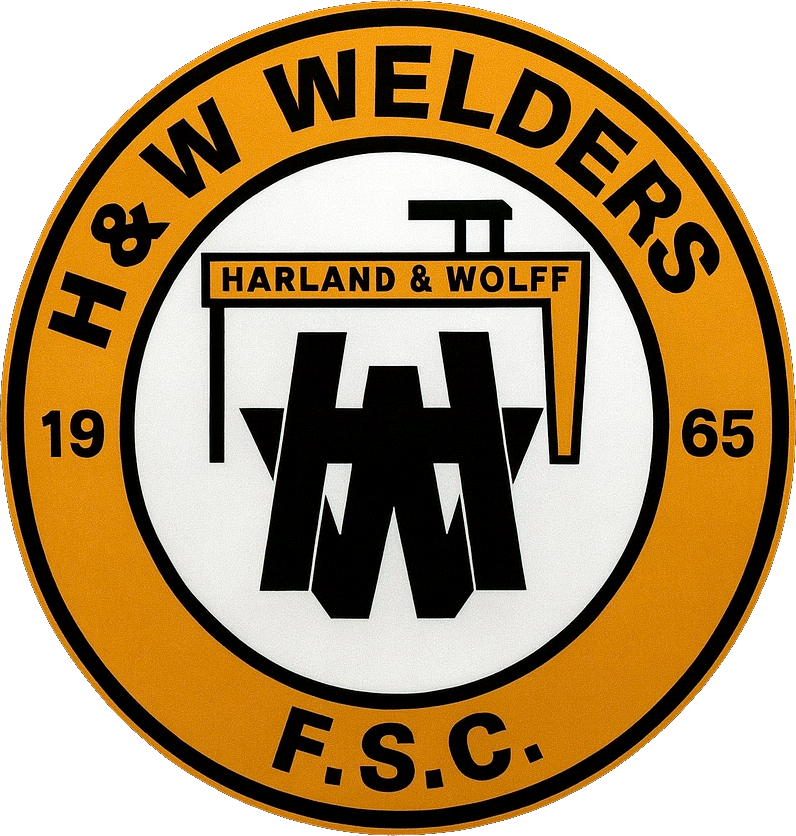
- Full name: Harland & Wolff Welders Football Club
- Nickname: The Welders
- Short name: H&W Welders
- Founded: 1965
- Ground: Blanchflower Park, Belfast
- Capacity: 2000
- Secretary: Scott McMillan
- Manager: Niall Currie
- League: NIFL Championship
- 2025–26: NIFL Championship, 3rd of 12
- Website: https://www.weldersfc.com/
Home colours colors	Away colours colors	Third colours colors

Harland & Wolff Welders Football Club is a semi-professional, Northern Irish football club playing in the NIFL Championship. The club originated as a company team of the Harland & Wolff shipyard in Belfast.

== History ==
Harland & Wolff Welders F.C. was established in 1965 by employees of the Harland & Wolff shipyard in Belfast, who raised funds within the welding department at the Musgrave Yard to form a team for the Saturday Morning League. The club’s early years were spent in local football, and by 1967, it had secured its first league title. Its ambition was to join the Northern Amateur League, which required a permanent home ground. Early fundraising took place in venues such as the Vulcan Bar and eventually led to the club acquiring premises on Castlereagh Street, later replaced by a move to Dee Street, where a larger social club developed.

The club’s progress on the pitch was hampered for years by the lack of a stable ground. Temporary arrangements included sharing facilities with Brantwood F.C. at Skegoneill Avenue. After entering the Amateur League, the Welders quickly made an impact, winning the Clarence Cup by defeating Chimney Corner in their debut season. Over the following decade, they won several league divisions and regularly reached cup finals. The club stepped up to intermediate football in the mid-1970s, allowing participation in competitions such as the Steel and Sons Cup and the Intermediate Cup. Continued ground issues saw the club move between venues until donations from Harland & Wolff's managing director, John Malabar, and a Norwegian shipping company enabled the construction of a pitch at the Belfast Harbour Estate.

Even with this new location, the club continued searching for a permanent base. This was eventually achieved with the move to Tillysburn Park in 1983, coinciding with its entry into the Irish League B Division. From this point the club established itself as a strong intermediate side, later winning the Intermediate Cup in 2003 and 2007, as well as multiple Smirnoff Cup victories in the late 1990s and early 2000s. The late 2000s saw a period of significant success, with back-to-back Championship League and cup doubles in 2009 and 2010 and promotion to Championship 1. In 2011, the Welders won the Steel and Sons Cup for the first time, defeating Knockbreda 3-1. The club remained at Tillysburn Park until moving to a modern new facility at Blanchflower Park in 2021.

== Current squad ==
As of 2026, the squad included:

Note: Flags indicate national team as defined under FIFA eligibility rules; some limited exceptions apply. Players may hold more than one non-FIFA nationality.

No.	Pos.	Nation	Player
2	MF	NIR	Lewis Patterson
6	MF	IRL	Daniel Kearns
8	MF	NIR	Craig Harris (Captain)
10	FW	NIR	Michael McLellan
12	MF	NIR	Adam McAleenan
18	DF	NIR	Jamie Glover
19	MF	NIR	Cain Stewart

No.	Pos.	Nation	Player
21	FW	NIR	Jackson Reid
22	DF	NIR	Ewan McCoubrey
25	DF	NIR	Bradley Hillis
28	FW	IRL	Daniel Mhondiwa
62	MF	NIR	Liam McKenna
TBA	DF	NIR	Kym Nelson
TBA	MF	NIR	Jack Reilly
TBA	FW	IRL	Kyle Robinson

== Honours ==
=== Intermediate honours ===
- Irish Intermediate Cup: 2
  - 2002–03, 2006–07
- B Division Knock-out Cup: 3
  - 1997–98, 2000–01, 2001–02
- Steel & Sons Cup: 2
  - 2010–11, 2015–16
- IFA Championship 2 (level 3): 1
  - 2009–10
- IFA Championship 2 League Cup: 1
  - 2009–10
- IFA Interim Intermediate League: 1
  - 2008–09
- IFA Interim Intermediate League Cup: 1
  - 2008–09
- George Wilson Cup: 1
  - 2017–18*
- Northern Amateur Football League: 1
  - 1978–79
- Clarence Cup: 1
  - 1968–69†

† Won by Harland & Wolff Welders "A"
* Won by Harland & Wolff Welders U20
