= Dungiven Celtic F.C. =

Association football club in Northern Ireland

Dungiven Celtic
- Full name: Dungiven Celtic Football Club
- Nickname(s): DCFC
- Founded: 1968
- League: Northern Ireland Intermediate League

Dungiven Celtic Football Club is an intermediate-level football club playing in the Northern Ireland Intermediate League in Northern Ireland. The club is based in Dungiven, County Londonderry.

== History ==
Dungiven Celtic were founded following a succession of clubs in the area in County Londonderry. Players from Dungiven were going to play for nearby Feeny F.C. Dernaflaw Rovers were then founded as an ad-hoc team for cup competitions to keep players within the village. In 1968, players from Dernaflaw Rovers wanted to join the Derry and District Sunday Football League, which resulted in the formation of Dungiven Celtic.

The club played their first match at the Brandywell Stadium wearing red and white stripes as their green and white hooped jerseys had not arrived in time. They set up their first youth team in 1993. The club has close relations with Dungiven GAC, the village's Gaelic Athletic Association club, with several of Dungiven Celtic's players concurrently playing Gaelic football at Dungiven GAC.

In 1978, they joined the newly established Northern Ireland Intermediate League and won their first intermediate trophy in the Craig Memorial Cup in 1984. In 2003 they won the Northern Ireland Intermediate League for the first time; they retained the title the following year and won it again in 2006 and 2009. They also compete in the Foyle Cup. Playing in the Northern Ireland Intermediate League, they enter the Irish Cup.

== Ground ==
Dungiven Celtic first started playing on a pitch near the local school which later became the pitch of the Gaelic football team when Dungiven Celtic left. They then moved to Ballyguddin, which they rented from the council, before eventually purchasing and resurfacing it in 2004.

== Honours ==
=== Intermediate honours ===
- Northern Ireland Intermediate League: 4
  - 2002–03, 2003–04, 2005–06, 2008–09
- Craig Memorial Cup: 1
  - 1983–84
