= Banbridge Town F.C. =

Association football club in Northern Ireland

Coordinates: 54°21′1.6″N 6°15′52.8″W

- Full name: Banbridge Town Football Club
- Nickname: The Town
- Founded: 1947
- Ground: Crystal Park
- Capacity: 1,000
- Chairman: David Maxwell
- Manager: Ronnie Haughey
- League: NCL Premier
- 2025–26: NIFL Premier Intermediate League, 14th of 14
- Website: www.banbridgetownfootballclub.com
Home colours	Away colours

Banbridge Town Football Club, referred to as Banbridge Town, is an intermediate football club from Northern Ireland playing in the NCL Premier, the third tier of football in Northern Ireland. The club are nicknamed "The Town", and have played in the lower divisions of Northern Irish football for much of their existence. Banbridge Town are a part of the Mid-Ulster Football Association. They compete in the Irish Cup.

== Brief History ==
The club, founded in 1947, hails from Banbridge, County Down and plays its home matches at Crystal Park. Club colours are red and black. In 2014, the club merged with Banbridge A.F.C. The 2016/17 season saw Banbridge Town's reserve team win the South Down Development League.

A high point of the clubs recent history came in 2018, when they defeated Dollingstown 4-0 to win the Bob Radcliffe Cup for the third time at Lakeview Park on Boxing Day.

The club was managed by Frankie Wilson from 2021 until his death in 2022. The club is currently managed by former Longford Town u20s manager Robbie Rock, following the resignation of David McCullough, owing to financial issues at the club.

The club has had many players go on to play in the top tier of football in Northern Ireland, including Paul Evans (Portadown), Roy Rea (Glentoran), Ryan Moffatt (Dungannon Swifts), Stephen Teggart (Glenavon & Portadown) and Barry Tumilty (Ballymena United).

In 2025, the club would have a difficult spell in NIFL Premier Intermediate League, following the announcement of the club experiencing significant financial issues. As such, recently appointed ex-Portadown midfielder David McCullough resigned as manager, and Dubliner Robbie Rock was appointed.

During that season, whilst working with a young group of players, with many coming from the Dublin area, the Town would experience heavy defeats to Rathfriland Rangers and Dollingstown, losing 9-0 and 10-0 respectively. The club would also be given a 12-point deduction and a £1,000 fine from NIFL for undisclosed payments made to players. This means that the club is highly likely to drop into regional football for the first time since 2004.

== Current squad ==
Note: Flags indicate national team as defined under FIFA eligibility rules; some limited exceptions apply. Players may hold more than one non-FIFA nationality.

No.	Pos.	Nation	Player
2	DF	NIR	Adam Campbell
3	DF	NIR	Conor Curran
4	MF	NIR	Ryan Gourley
8	MF	NIR	Logan Sands
9	FW	NIR	Alex Dillon
10	FW	IRL	Ebuka Kewelele
11	FW	NIR	Reece Doyle
12	DF	NIR	Liam Vaughan
14	MF	NIR	Sean McCaul

No.	Pos.	Nation	Player
16	MF	NIR	Sean Óg Gallagher
17	FW	NIR	Andy Wilson
18	DF	NIR	Dan Smith
19	DF	NIR	Adam Hamilton
20	MF	NIR	Josh Dennison
23	DF	NIR	Ben McKeown
82	FW	NIR	Matt Taylor
96	GK	NIR	Ben Purvis

== Honours ==
=== Senior honours ===
- Mid-Ulster Cup: 5
  - 1948–49, 1949–50 (shared), 1958–59, 1973–74, 1979–80

=== Intermediate honours ===
- Irish League B Division: 1
  - 1955–56
- Irish Intermediate Cup: 1
  - 1985–86
- George Wilson Cup: 1
  - 1976–77
- Louis Moore Cup: 2
  - 1955–56, 1967–68
- Bob Radcliffe Cup: 3
  - 1980–81, 2010–11, 2018–19
- Alan Wilson Memorial Cup: 1
  - 1986–87
