= Queen's University Belfast A.F.C. =

Association football club in Northern Ireland

Queen's University Belfast
- Full name: Queen's University Belfast Association Football Club
- Founded: 1910
- Ground: Upper Malone
- Capacity: 1,000 (330 seated)
- Manager: James Lavery
- League: NIFL Championship
- 2025–26: NIFL Championship, 5th of 12
Home colours	Away colours

Queen's University Association Football Club, referred to simply as Queen's is a semi-professional, Northern Irish football club playing in the NIFL Championship. Queen's AFC is associated with Queen's University Belfast.

Queen's University also have an affiliated football team known as Queen's Grads F.C. They were founded in 1973. Queen's Grads have teams registered in the Northern Amateur Football League and the Down Area Winter Football League. QUB AFC also registered a reserves team in the NAFL.

== History ==
The club, founded in 1910, a founder member of the Irish League B Division, is affiliated to Queen's University Belfast, and plays home matches at the newly built Arena at the Queen's University sports grounds, Upper Malone, Belfast - also known as "the Dub".

From 2003 to 2011, the club played its home matches at Newforge Lane, the home of PSNI F.C., while the new stadium at the Dub was being constructed.

The team play in white shirts and black shorts/socks. The away kit is all blue.

The university allows for a 25% non association with regards to playing staff whilst the other 75% are required to have studied, or be studying, at Queen's University Belfast.

On the 4 January 2020, Queens University recorded their greatest win in their history by defeating Linfield by two goals to one in the Irish Cup. Shayne Lavery cancelled out Marc McKenna's opener for Queen's and Jonah Mitchell scored the winner halfway through the second half.

== Current squad ==
Note: Flags indicate national team as defined under FIFA eligibility rules; some limited exceptions apply. Players may hold more than one non-FIFA nationality.

No.	Pos.	Nation	Player
1	GK	NIR	Neil Shields
2	DF	NIR	Jack Ovens (on loan from Portadown)
3	DF	NIR	Adam Robinson
4	MF	NIR	Adam Green
5	DF	NIR	Matthew McManus
6	FW	NIR	Marc McKenna
7	FW	NIR	Chris Middleton
8	MF	NIR	Ben Mulgrew
9	MF	NIR	Matthew Hughes
10	MF	NIR	Ronan Young

No.	Pos.	Nation	Player
11	MF	NIR	James Clarke
12	FW	NIR	Angus Youngson
13	MF	NIR	Eoin Brown
14	FW	NIR	Lorcan McIlroy
15	DF	NIR	Adam Calvert
16	FW	NIR	Leon Bonnes
17	FW	NIR	Ciaran O'Hare
28	GK	NIR	Conan Doherty
36	GK	NIR	Andrew Gawne
49	FW	NIR	Charlie Chapman (on loan from Linfield)

== Honours ==
=== Intermediate honours ===
- NIFL Premier Intermediate League: 1
  - 2018–19
- Intermediate Cup: 1
  - 2017–18

=== Junior honours ===
- Collingwood Cup: 13+
  - 1920, 1947, 1957, 1960, 1962, 1963, 1964, 1965, 1966, 1975, 1977, 1982, 1985 ^{See Note 1}
- ^1 The records for the 1920s and 1930s Collingwood Cup are a bit vague so the exact number of wins for QUB is uncertain.

=== Queens Grads FC honours ===
Northern Amateur Football League

- Division 3C
  - 2003/4
- Division 3D
  - 1995/6
- Division 2B
  - 2008/9
- Cochrane Corry Cup
  - 1995/6
