= Dunmurry Recreation F.C. =

Association football club in Northern Ireland

Dunmurry Rec
- Full name: Dunmurry Recreation Football Club
- Nickname: The Rec
- Founded: 1879
- Ground: Ashley Park, Dunmurry, Belfast
- Chairman: Ryan Adams
- Manager: Mark Porter
- League: NAFL Division 1A

Dunmurry Recreation & Football Club, commonly referred to as Dunmurry Rec, is a Northern Irish, intermediate football club playing in Division 1A of the Northern Amateur Football League. It currently has two senior men's teams playing in the NAFL as well as a NI Supporters Club and a Golf Society. The club is based in Dunmurry, Belfast, and plays in the Irish Cup.

== Honours ==
=== Intermediate ===
- Steel & Sons Cup: 3
  - 1897-98, 1919-20, 1998–99
- Irish Intermediate Cup: 2
  - 1922-23, 1929-30
- Irish Intermediate League: 1
  - 1923–24
- Northern Amateur Football League Premier Division: 4
  - 1979-80, 1987-88, 1991–92, 1998–99
- Border Cup: 3
  - 1953-54, 1991–92, 2006–07

== Junior ==
- County Antrim Junior Shield: 1
  - 1915-16
- Northern Amateur Football League 3D: 1
  - 1986-87
- Walter Moore Cup: 2
  - 1980-81, 1982-83
