= Ards Rangers F.C. =

Association football club in Northern Ireland

Ards Rangers
- Full name: Ards Rangers Football Club
- Founded: 1949
- Ground: Drome Park, Newtownards
- Chairman: Gary Gallagher
- Manager: Lee Cathcart
- League: NAFL Premier Division

Ards Rangers Football Club is a Northern Irish, intermediate football club playing in the Premier Division of the Northern Amateur Football League. The club was formed in 1949 and plays at Drome Park, Newtownards. Ards Rangers were admitted into the Amateur League in 1962. Their former manager was Jackie Kerr. The current side is managed by Lee Cathcart. The reserves team the Ards Rangers Colts, play in the DAWFL.

Ards Rangers has 6 senior teams and a thriving Junior section. The Club has 4 Mens Senior teams and 2 Ladies Senior teams.

== Honours ==
=== Intermediate honours ===
- Northern Amateur Football League: 3
  - 1997–98, 2011–12, 2014–15
- Border Cup: 3
  - 1966–67, 1979–80, 2014–15

== Sources ==
- Johnstone & G. Hamilton (n.d.) A Memorable Milestone: 75 Years of the Northern Amateur Football League
