= Tobermore United F.C. =

Association football club in Northern Ireland

Tobermore United
- Full name: Tobermore United Football Club
- Nickname: "The Reds"
- Founded: 1965
- Ground: Fortwilliam Park, Tobermore
- Capacity: approx. 1,500
- Coordinates: 54.8173°N 6.7012°W
- League: Ballymena & Provincial Football League (Intermediate Division Two)
| Home colours | Away colours |

Tobermore United Football Club is an intermediate, Northern Irish football club playing in Intermediate Division Two of the Ballymena & Provincial Football League .

== History ==
The club, founded in 1965, is based in Tobermore, near Magherafelt, County Londonderry. The club's main colours are red and black.

Tobermore United is the only football club in Northern Ireland that George Best ever played competitively for. However, it was only for one match, on 11 February 1984, after many years of his decline, and Tobermore lost 7–0 to Ballymena United.

The club has a youth development scheme and it was awarded official Football Development Centre (FDC) status by the IFA. It has teams at under-11, under-12, under-14 and under-16 level.

In the 2010/11 season, the club gained promotion to IFA Championship 1 by finishing 2nd in IFA Championship 2, but were relegated again two-years later.

In the 2016/17 season, the IFA Championship 2 was changed to the NIFL Premier Intermediate League. In its inaugural season, Tobermore finished 5th.

In the 2018/19 season, Tobermore finished in 3rd place in the Premier Intermediate League.

Following the curtailed 2019–20 Premier Intermediate League season, Tobermore finished 11th and technically bottom of the league however weren't relegated due to no appropriate promotion candidates, and given the league had already lost Lurgan Celtic who had withdrawn.

Due to COVID-19, the 2020/21 season wasn't played, and the Premier Intermediate League began again in the 2021/22 season. Tobermore finished bottom once again, but were not relegated as there were 11 teams in the league when there were meant to be 12 (Ballymacash Rangers F.C. were promoted to the Premier Intermediate League and nobody was relegated to allow a 12-team league for the following season).

In the 2022/23 season, Tobermore finished 6th in the NIFL Premier Intermediate League, making it into the top section of the split but finishing bottom of it.

== Ground ==
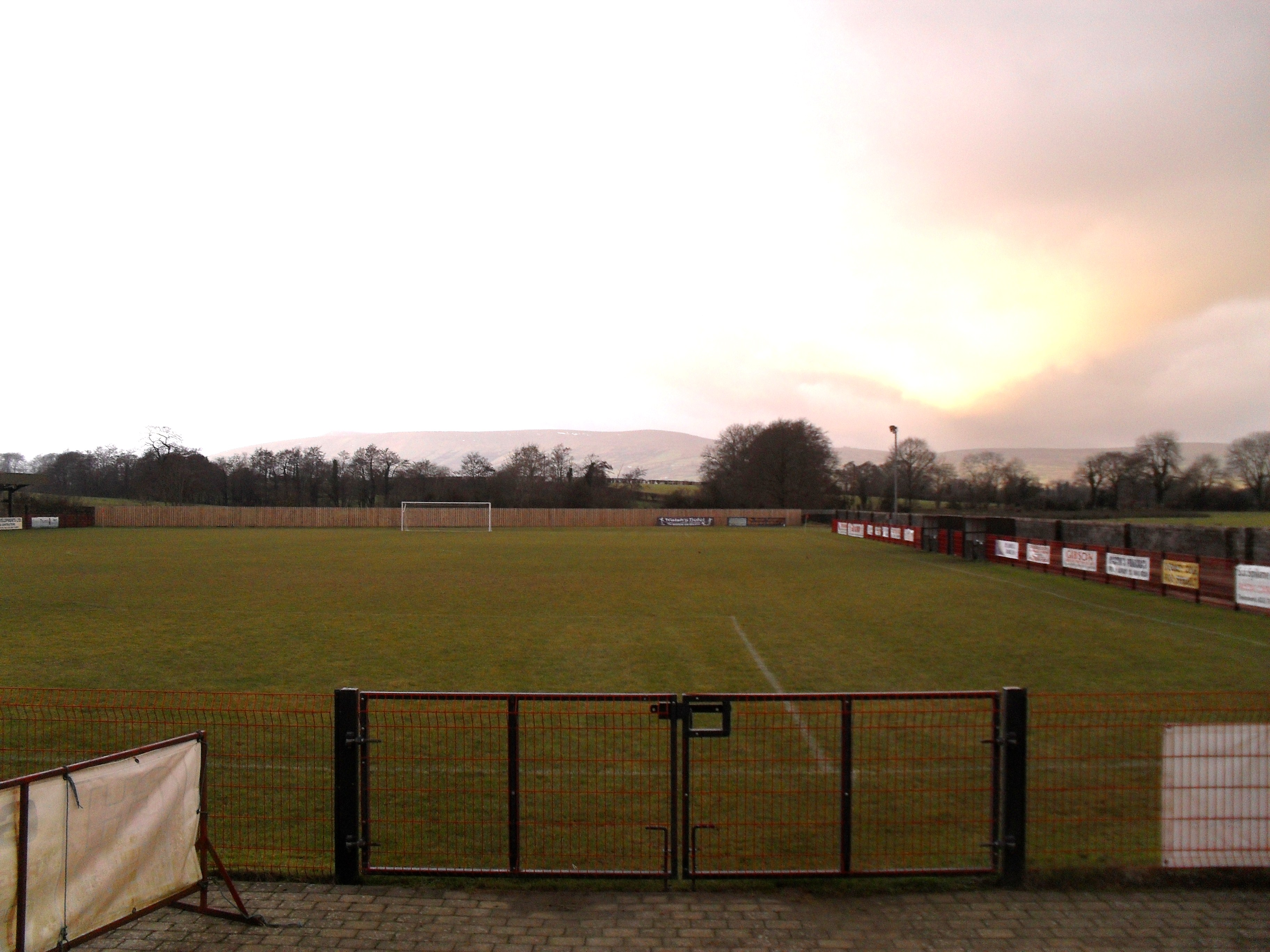
Fortwilliam Park

The club plays its home matches at Fortwilliam Park outside Tobermore village. It has capacity for approximately 1,500 spectators. In 1984, it hosted a crowd of approximately 4,000 when George Best played his only competitive club match in Northern Ireland. The match, an Irish Cup tie between Tobermore United and Ballymena United, ended 0–7 to Ballymena.

== Honours ==
=== Senior honours ===
- North West Senior Cup: 3
  - 1980–81, 1989–90, 2006–07

=== Intermediate honours ===
- IFA Intermediate League Second Division: 1
  - 2004–05
- Craig Memorial Cup: 6
  - 1980–81, 1988–89, 1989–90, 1997–98, 2005–06, 2009–10
- Northern Ireland Intermediate League: 3
  - 1978–79, 1981–82, 1982–83
- Northern Ireland Intermediate League Cup: 2
  - 1978–79, 1981–82
- North West Intermediate Cup Winners: 2
  - 1989–90, 2005–06
