= Oxford United Stars F.C. =

Association football club in Northern Ireland

Oxford United Stars
- Full name: Oxford United Stars Football Club
- Nickname: Oxford Stars
- Founded: 1967
- Ground: Swilly Stadium
- Capacity: 1200
- League: Northern Ireland Intermediate League
Home colours

Oxford United Stars Football Club is a Northern Ireland football club, founded in 1937, based in Derry. As of 2016, the club was competing in the Northern Ireland Intermediate League. They are known as the U2's in reference to Oxford United's nickname 'The U's'. The club graduated to the second division of the Irish League after competing in local amateur leagues, including the Derry and District League, which the reserve team, Oxford United, now plays in.

== History ==
Oxford United Stars was formed in 1968 initially as a youth football team to compete in underage football competitions. The club achieved some successes at this level and developed a youth academy which led to a steady stream of young footballers graduating through their ranks. The club then entered the junior football ranks through competed in competitions under the auspices of the Irish Football Association. Oxford United Stars played in the North West Saturday Morning League and in all the major summer cup competitions throughout the north west of Ireland and several honours. In 1976, the club applied for senior status and were elected to the newly formed Northern Ireland Intermediate League in 1978.

== Club colours ==
The club's colours, adopted in 1965, are black and blue strips, similar to that of Inter Milan.

== League status ==
Oxford United Stars entered the IFA Intermediate League in 2004, but failed to obtain a place in the IFA Championship which replaced that league in 2008. Instead, the club competed in the IFA Interim League during 2008–09. It failed again to gain a place in the Championship in 2009 and dropped back to the Northern Ireland Intermediate League in which it had played prior to 2004. The reserve team competes in the Derry and District League Premier Division and the most senior youth team competes in the First Division of the Sunday Morning League.

== Honours ==
=== Intermediate honours ===
- Craig Memorial Cup: 1
  - 1995–96
- Northern Ireland Intermediate League: 5
  - 1986–87, 1988–89, 1995–96, 1996–97, 1997–98, 2009–10, 2013–14
- Northern Ireland Intermediate League Cup
  - 2011, 2012
- Northern Ireland Challenge Cup
  - 2013, 2014, 2016

== Notable former players ==
- David Campbell
- Peter Hutton
- Daniel Lafferty
