= Ballymoney United F.C. =

Association football club in Northern Ireland

Ballymoney United
- Full name: Ballymoney United Football Club
- Nickname: The Toon
- Founded: 1944
- Ground: The Riada Stadium
- Chairman: Adrian Barkley
- Manager: John Connolly
- League: Ballymena & Provincial Football League
- 2026-27: Ballymena & Provincial Football League
Home colours

Ballymoney United Football Club is an intermediate, Northern Irish football club playing in the Ballymena & Provincial Football League. The club, founded in 1944, hails from Ballymoney, County Antrim and currently plays its home matches at Riada Stadium. Before relegation from the Northern Ireland Football League in 2015, the club played at the Riada Stadium in Ballymoney, which is shared with Glebe Rangers. Club colours are all blue with a white and black away kit.

== Honours ==
=== Intermediate honours ===
- B Division Knockout Cup: 1
  - 1998–99
- Northern Ireland Intermediate League: 3
  - 1980–81, 1982–83, 2015–16

=== Junior honours ===
- Irish Junior Cup: 1
  - 1960–61†

† Won by reserve side

== Notable former players ==
- (Republic of Ireland) Jimmy Kelly
