= Noel Bailie =

Northern Irish footballer

Noel Bailie MBE
Personal information
- Date of birth: 23 February 1971 (age 55)
- Place of birth: Belfast, Northern Ireland
- Positions: Central defender; sweeper

Youth career
- Hillsborough Boys Club
- 1986–1989: Linfield

Senior career*
Years	Team	Apps	(Gls)
1989–2011	Linfield		

International career
1990	Northern Ireland U23	1	(0)
1990–1994	Northern Ireland U21	2	(0)
1990–1995	Irish League XI	2	(0)
- Northern Ireland U18
- Northern Ireland Under-18 Schools
1987	Northern Ireland U17	1	(0)
1986–1987	Northern Ireland U16	7	(0)
- * Club domestic league appearances and goals

Noel Bailie MBE (born 23 February 1971) is a Northern Irish former semi-professional footballer who spent his entire career playing for Linfield. He played as a sweeper and wore shirt number 11. He won 37 club titles with Linfield. He also has made in excess of 1,000 career appearances.

== Playing career ==
Bailie joined Linfield in 1986 from Hillsborough Boys' Club and this was the only club he ever played for during his senior career. Bailie began playing in the reserve team (Linfield Swifts) and made his first team debut on 30 March 1989 away to Ballymena United in the County Antrim Shield first round tie at the age of 18. In the 1993–94 season he was named as the Ulster Footballer of the Year. Bailie played under four different Linfield managers - Roy Coyle, Eric Bowyer, Trevor Anderson and David Jeffrey.

He played his 1,000th game for Linfield in a 0–0 draw against Crusaders on the 24 April 2010, getting a guard of honour from both sets of players as he left the pitch after the match. He made his final career appearance in Linfield's 1–0 win over Portadown on 30 April 2011, where he lifted the IFA Premiership trophy. This was his 1,013th appearance for the club in all competitions.

Bailie's number 11 jersey was retired by the club upon his retirement as a player at the end of the 2010–11 season. Bailie was appointed Member of the Order of the British Empire (MBE) in the 2013 Birthday Honours for services to football in Northern Ireland.

== Honours ==
=== Club ===
Linfield

- Irish League (10): 1992–93, 1993–94, 1999–2000, 2000–01, 2003–04, 2005–06, 2006–07, 2007–08, 2009–10, 2010–11
- Irish Cup (8): 1993–94, 1994–95, 2001–02, 2005–06, 2006–07, 2007–08, 2009–10, 2010–11
- Irish League Cup (8): 1991–92, 1993–94, 1997–98, 1998–99, 1999–2000, 2001–02, 2005–06, 2007–08
- Setanta Sports Cup: 2005
- County Antrim Shield (6): 1994–95, 1997–98, 2000–01, 2003–04, 2004–05, 2005–06
- Irish FA Charity Shield (3): 1993, 1994, 2000
- Gold Cup (2): 1989–90, 1996–97
- Floodlit Cup (2): 1993–94, 1997–98
- Ulster Cup: 1992–93

== See also ==
- List of men's footballers with the most official appearances
- List of one-club men
