= David Jeffrey =

Northern Irish footballer and manager

David Jeffrey MBE
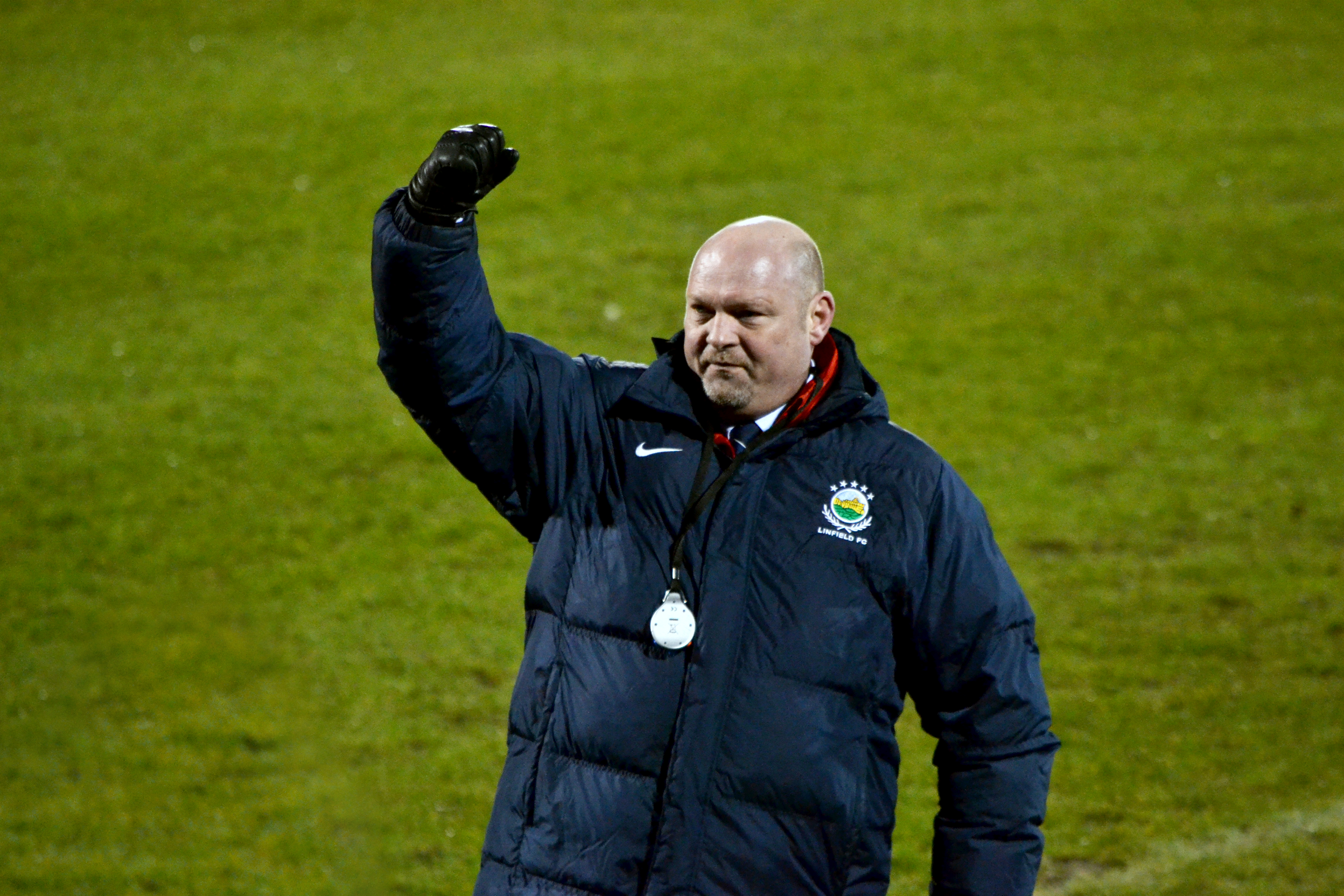
- Jeffrey in 2014

Personal information
- Date of birth: 28 October 1962 (age 64)
- Place of birth: Newtownards, Northern Ireland
- Position: Defender

Youth career
- 1979–1982: Manchester United

Senior career*
| Years | Team | Apps | (Gls) |
| 1982–1992 | Linfield | 369 | (69) |
| 1992–1995 | Ards | 65 | (2) |
| 1995–1996 | Larne | 22 | (1) |

International career
| 1977–1978 | Northern Ireland U15 | 8 | |
| 1981 | Northern Ireland U18 | 2 | |
| 1984–1989 | Irish Football League XI | 9 | (0) |

Managerial career
- 1995–1996: Larne
- 1997–2014: Linfield
- 2016–2023: Ballymena United
- 2026-: Portadown
- * Club domestic league appearances and goals

David Jeffrey MBE (born 28 October 1962) is a Northern Irish former football player and current manager of NIFL Premiership side Portadown.

Jeffrey previously managed Linfield between 1997 and 2014 and Ballymena United from 2016 to 2023. Jeffrey began his professional playing career with Linfield, following a spell in the Manchester United youth team, and also played for Ards and Larne.

== Personal life ==
Born in Newtownards, Jeffrey attended Dundonald High School and Sullivan Upper School. He lives in Glengormley and has a career in social work alongside his management career. He has two sons, Gareth and Thomas, and is a member of both the Orange Order and a flute band. He cites his parents as the biggest inspiration in his life.

Jeffrey is a Christian. In an interview with the Belfast Telegraph in 2020, he described himself as having "an unapologetic and unashamed very strong faith in God".

== Playing career ==
Jeffrey began his football career as a schoolboy with Manchester United but never played in the first team. He joined Linfield in the summer of 1982. He played for Linfield for ten years and was club captain for much of that time. Jeffrey scored the crucial away goal against Shamrock Rovers in the 1984–85 European Cup. He left Windsor Park for his hometown club, Ards, in the summer of 1992, reuniting him with former boss Roy Coyle, and in February 1995 joined Larne as player-coach.

== Managerial career ==
=== Linfield ===
In April 1996, Jeffrey returned to Linfield as assistant manager to Trevor Anderson. Jeffrey was appointed as Linfield manager on 4 January 1997 after Anderson resigned.

In the 2005–06 season, Jeffrey guided Linfield to a clean sweep of domestic trophies, missing out only on the cross-border All-Ireland Cup. On 6 June 2006, Jeffrey signed a new four-year contract, the longest contract in Linfield history. His previous deal had one season left to run.

In June 2008, Jeffrey won his 23rd manager of the month award, breaking the record for monthly awards. By January 2014, he had extended this record to 32 awards.

Alongside Roy Coyle, Jeffrey is Linfield's most successful manager in history, having won 31 trophies during his 17-year tenure. Roy Coyle also won 31 trophies with the Blues during his managerial career from 1975 to 1990.

On 15 February 2014, Jeffrey announced that he was to step down as manager of Linfield at the end of the 2013–14 season. He was replaced by former Northern Ireland international, Warren Feeney.

=== Ballymena United ===
On 7 March 2016, it was announced that Jeffrey had been appointed the new manager of Ballymena United, following the dismissal of Glenn Ferguson.

Jeffrey guided Ballymena to winning the Northern Irish League Cup in the 2016–17 season and took them to the quarter-finals of the Irish Cup and a 4th place finish in the league.

Jeffrey was appointed Member of the Order of the British Empire (MBE) in the 2021 Birthday Honours for services to association football and community relations in Northern Ireland.

=== Portadown ===
On 21st April 2026, it was announced that Jeffery had been appointed as manager of Portadown FC, following the departure of manager Niall Currie a few weeks earlier.

== Managerial statistics ==
| Team | Nation | From | To | Record | | | | | | | |
| Team | Nation | From | To | G | W | D | L | F | A | GD | Win % |
|---|---|---|---|---|---|---|---|---|---|---|---|
| Linfield | Northern Ireland | 4 January 1997 | 27 April 2014 | 944 | 579 | 197 | 168 | 1,958 | 845 | +1,013 | 61.33 |
| Ballymena United | Northern Ireland | 7 March 2016 | 10 May 2023 | 346 | 163 | 48 | 136 | 559 | 502 | +57 | 47.11 |
| Portadown | Northern Ireland | 1 June 2026 | present | 11 | 1 | 2 | 8 | 8 | 20 | -12 | 9.09 |
| Total | | | | 1,301 | 743 | 247 | 312 | 2,525 | 1,367 | +1,058 | 57.11 |

As of 8 May 2023

== Managerial honours ==
Linfield

- Irish Premier League/IFA Premiership (9): 1999–2000, 2000–01, 2003–04, 2005–06, 2006–07, 2007–08, 2009–10, 2010–11, 2011–12
- Irish Cup (7): 2001–02, 2005–06, 2006–07, 2007–08, 2009–10, 2010–11, 2011–12
- Irish League Cup (6): 1997–98, 1998–99, 1999–2000, 2001–02, 2005–06, 2007–08
- County Antrim Shield (6): 1997–98, 2000–01, 2003–04, 2004–05, 2005–06, 2013–14
- Setanta Cup: 2005
- Irish FA Charity Shield: 2000
- Irish League Floodlit Cup: 1997–98

Ballymena United

- Northern Ireland Football League Cup: 2016–17

== See also ==
- List of football managers with the most matches
