= Paul McAreavey =

Northern Irish footballer and manager

Personal information
- Date of birth: 3 December 1980 (age 45)
- Place of birth: Belfast, Northern Ireland
- Position: Midfielder

Senior career*
Years	Team	Apps	(Gls)
1997–2002	Swindon Town	24	(1)
2000–2001	→ Kilkenny City (loan)		
2002–2003	Portadown		
2003–2009	Linfield		
2009	Dundalk	10	(0)
2011	Ballymena United	3	(0)
2013	Donegal Celtic	15	(0)

International career
	Northern Ireland U21	7	(0)

Managerial career
- 2013–2014: Donegal Celtic
- * Club domestic league appearances and goals

Paul McAreavey (born 3 December 1980) is a Northern Irish football manager and former player. He previously played for Swindon Town, Linfield, Dundalk, Ballymena United and Donegal Celtic.

In May 2006 the Belfast native signed a three-year full-time deal with Linfield.

In August 2013 McAreavy returned to Donegal Celtic as manager following the departure of his predecessor Pat McAllister. McAreavey left his position in June 2014, with Nicky Maye, a coach under McAreavey, promoted to manager.

== Honours ==
Linfield

- Irish League (4): 2003-04, 2005-06, 2006-07, 2007-08
- Irish Cup (3): 2005-06, 2006-07, 2007-08
- Irish League Cup (2): 2005-06, 2007-08
- Setanta Sports Cup (1): 2005
