= 2014–15 Northern Ireland Football League =

Northern Ireland Football League
- Season: 2014–15
- Champions: Crusaders
- Relegated: Ballymoney United

The 2014–15 Northern Ireland Football League was the second season of Northern Ireland's national football league running independently as the Northern Ireland Football League, consisting of the top three levels of the national league system, namely: the Premiership, Championship 1, and Championship 2. It was the 114th season of Irish league football overall. The season began on 8 August 2014 and concluded on 2 May 2015.

Cliftonville were the defending champions, after they won a second consecutive title the previous season for the first time in the club's history – their fourth outright league title and fifth overall. Ten years after suffering relegation to the second tier in 2004–05 and just eight years after their return to the top flight in 2006–07, Crusaders were this season's champions. They lifted the title for the fifth time overall on 18 April 2015 – their first top flight title in the 18 years since their last win in the 1996–97 season.

For the second successive season, a club was relegated to regional football. Ballymoney United finished bottom of Championship 2 and were relegated to a regional division for the following season.

== Promotion and relegation ==
Promoted from Championship 1 to the Premiership

- Institute (1st in NIFL Championship 1)

Relegated from the Premiership to Championship 1

- Ards (12th in NIFL Premiership)

Promoted from Championship 2 to Championship 1

- Armagh City (1st in Championship 2)
- PSNI (2nd in Championship 2)

Relegated from Championship 1 to Championship 2

- Coagh United (13th in Championship 1)
- Limavady United (14th in Championship 1)

Promoted from Mid-Ulster Football League to Championship 2

- Dollingstown (1st in MUFL Intermediate A Division – promoted via play-off)

Relegated from Championship 2 to Ballymena & Provincial League

- Chimney Corner (14th in Championship 2 – club resigned)
- Killymoon Rangers (16th in Championship 2)

== League tables ==
=== Premiership ===
Pos	Team	Pld	W	D	L	GF	GA	GD	Pts	Qualification or relegation
1	Crusaders (C)	38	25	7	6	93	43	+50	82	Qualification to Champions League first qualifying round
2	Linfield	38	21	9	8	67	46	+21	72	Qualification to Europa League first qualifying round
3	Glenavon	38	20	6	12	82	65	+17	66	Qualification to Europa League first qualifying round
4	Portadown	38	17	11	10	65	56	+9	62	
5	Cliftonville	38	16	13	9	71	47	+24	61	
6	Glentoran	38	16	10	12	67	51	+16	58	Qualification to Europa League first qualifying round (Note: Glentoran qualified for the Europa League first qualifying round as 2014–15 Irish Cup winners.)
7	Ballymena United	38	15	6	17	62	75	−13	51	
8	Coleraine	38	13	7	18	48	55	−7	46 (Note: Coleraine and Institute both fielded an ineligible player in the same match. The original 4–0 Coleraine win was voided with a 3–0 loss being recorded for both clubs, resulting in the final league table having two more losses than wins, and an overall goal difference of –6.)	
9	Ballinamallard United	38	10	9	19	40	71	−31	39	
10	Dungannon Swifts	38	8	13	17	38	56	−18	37	
11	Warrenpoint Town (O)	38	6	12	20	50	76	−26	30	Qualification to Promotion/relegation play-off
12	Institute (R)	38	4	9	25	36	84	−48	21	Relegation to NIFL Championship 1

Source: rsssf.com
Rules for classification: 1) Points; 2) Goal difference; 3) Number of goals scored; 4) Head-to-head points; 5) Head-to-head goal difference
(C) Champions; (O) Play-off winners; (R) Relegated

=== Championship 1 ===
Pos	Team	Pld	W	D	L	GF	GA	GD	Pts	Promotion or relegation
1	Carrick Rangers (C, P)	26	19	5	2	54	22	+32	62	Promotion to NIFL Premiership
2	Bangor	26	18	6	2	71	32	+39	60	Qualification to promotion play-off
3	Ards	26	16	8	2	61	30	+31	56	
4	Harland & Wolff Welders	26	15	5	6	59	37	+22	50	
5	Larne	26	13	3	10	52	36	+16	42	
6	Dergview	26	8	9	9	40	43	−3	33	
7	Armagh City	26	9	5	12	38	48	−10	32	
8	Knockbreda	26	9	3	14	31	43	−12	30	
9	Ballyclare Comrades	26	8	4	14	46	48	−2	28	
10	Lisburn Distillery	26	8	4	14	38	58	−20	28	
11	Loughgall	26	7	6	13	36	54	−18	27	
12	Donegal Celtic	26	5	9	12	35	42	−7	24	
13	PSNI (R)	26	6	5	15	27	64	−37	23	Relegation to NIFL Championship 2
14	Dundela (R)	26	3	4	19	34	65	−31	13	Relegation to NIFL Championship 2

Source: rsssf.com
Rules for classification: 1st points; 2nd goal difference; 3rd goals scored; 4th head-to-head points; 5th head-to-head goal difference
(C) Champions; (P) Promoted; (R) Relegated

=== Championship 2 ===
Pos	Team	Pld	W	D	L	GF	GA	GD	Pts	Promotion or relegation
1	Lurgan Celtic (C, P)	28	19	6	3	68	21	+47	63	Promotion to NIFL Championship 1
2	Annagh United (P)	28	18	4	6	73	46	+27	58	Promotion to NIFL Championship 1
3	Limavady United	28	17	5	6	67	32	+35	56	
4	Sport & Leisure Swifts	28	16	5	7	50	34	+16	53	
5	Newington YC	28	15	5	8	40	29	+11	50	
6	Moyola Park	28	14	6	8	58	44	+14	48	
7	Dollingstown	28	12	7	9	53	39	+14	43	
8	Portstewart	28	12	6	10	43	40	+3	42	
9	Queen's University	28	11	7	10	48	34	+14	40	
10	Tobermore United	28	9	7	12	48	45	+3	34	
11	Banbridge Town	28	7	7	14	38	70	−32	28	
12	Glebe Rangers	28	6	6	16	45	64	−19	24	
13	Wakehurst	28	6	4	18	28	68	−40	22	
14	Coagh United	28	3	6	19	29	72	−43	15	
15	Ballymoney United (R)	28	2	5	21	26	76	−50	11	Relegation to Level 4 Regional league

Source: rsssf.com
Rules for classification: 1st points; 2nd goal difference; 3rd goals scored; 4th head-to-head points; 5th head-to-head goal difference
(C) Champions; (P) Promoted; (R) Relegated
