= 2008–09 IFA Championship =

IFA Championship
- Champions: Portadown
- Promoted: Portadown
- Relegated: Tobermore United; Dergview; Killymoon Rangers
- Matches played: 272
- Goals scored: 886 (3.26 per match)

Location of teams in the 2008–09 IFA Championship

The 2008–09 IFA Championship (known as the Ladbrokes.com Championship for sponsorship reasons) was the first season of a major overhaul of the league system in Northern Ireland. The 2008–09 Championship consisted of one division of 17 clubs, with the clubs having intermediate status. The Championship served as the second tier of Northern Irish football for this season. With no promotion from the IFA Interim Intermediate League this season, from next season the division would be reduced to 14 clubs, with the newly introduced Championship 2 having 15.

Portadown were the champions, achieving promotion back to the top flight after only one season of absence. Donegal Celtic finished as runners-up but lost out on promotion as they were defeated on the away goals rule by Dungannon Swifts, when the Promotion/relegation play-off finished 2–2 on aggregate.

The bottom 3 clubs (Tobermore United, Dergview and Killymoon Rangers) were relegated to the newly introduced Championship 2 for next season.

== League table ==
Pos	Team	Pld	W	D	L	GF	GA	GD	Pts	Promotion or relegation
1	Portadown (C, P)	32	25	2	5	88	23	+65	77	Promotion to IFA Premiership
2	Donegal Celtic	32	24	1	7	65	27	+38	73	Qualification to promotion play-off
3	Loughgall	32	22	4	6	77	29	+48	70	
4	Ards	32	20	5	7	53	26	+27	65	
5	Ballinamallard United	32	19	6	7	73	47	+26	63	
6	Coagh United	32	19	4	9	60	43	+17	61	
7	Banbridge Town	32	15	5	12	66	67	−1	50	
8	Ballymoney United	32	12	7	13	41	35	+6	43	
9	Larne	32	12	7	13	53	56	−3	43	
10	Carrick Rangers	32	12	6	14	56	53	+3	42	
11	Glebe Rangers	32	9	7	16	37	56	−19	34	
12	Armagh City	32	8	8	16	39	61	−22	32	
13	Limavady United	32	9	3	20	46	72	−26	30	
14	Ballyclare Comrades	32	8	6	18	34	62	−28	30	
15	Tobermore United (R)	32	7	5	20	34	64	−30	26	Relegation to IFA Championship 2
16	Dergview (R)	32	6	1	25	31	84	−53	19	Relegation to IFA Championship 2
17	Killymoon Rangers (R)	32	4	5	23	33	81	−48	17	Relegation to IFA Championship 2

Source: rsssf.com
Rules for classification: 1st points; 2nd goal difference; 3rd goals scored; 4th head-to-head points; 5th head-to-head goal difference
(C) Champions; (P) Promoted; (R) Relegated

== Interim Intermediate League ==
From next season, the IFA Championship would consist of two divisions, Championships 1 and 2. The IFA Interim Intermediate League was introduced as a temporary third-tier league for the 2008–09 season only, consisting of the former members of the IFA Intermediate League (dissolved in 2008) who did not meet the criteria for the new Championship 2; it consisted of 12 clubs. Members of the Interim League had one year to make improvements in order to gain entry to Championship 2 for next season.

10 of the 12 clubs managed to meet the criteria, along with Sport & Leisure Swifts and Knockbreda who both achieved intermediate status, with only Brantwood and Oxford United Stars failing to do so. Harland & Wolff Welders were the champions. There was no promotion from the Interim League which meant that Championship 1 would be reduced to 14 clubs, with Championship 2 having 15.
