= 2008–09 IFA Premiership =

IFA Premiership
- Season: 2008–09
- Champions: Glentoran; 1st Premiership title 23rd Irish title
- Relegated: Bangor
- UEFA Champions League: Glentoran
- UEFA Europa League: Crusaders (via Irish Cup); Linfield; Lisburn Distillery
- Matches played: 228
- Goals scored: 619 (2.71 per match)
- Top goalscorer: Curtis Allen (19 goals)
- Biggest home win: Linfield 7–0 Institute
- Biggest away win: Bangor 0–5 Crusaders; Bangor 0–5 Linfield; Crusaders 0–5 Linfield
- Highest scoring: Dungannon Swifts 3–6 Crusaders
- Highest attendance: 9,500; Linfield 3–0 Glentoran (26 December 2008)
- Lowest attendance: 76; Bangor 1–3 Dungannon Swifts (25 April 2009)
- Average attendance: 858

The 2008–09 IFA Premiership (known as the JJB Sports Premiership for sponsorship reasons) was the 1st season of the IFA Premiership, the highest level of league football in Northern Ireland (after a major overhaul of the league system), and the 108th season of Irish league football overall.

Glentoran were champions, winning the league for the 23rd time.

== Summary ==
It was scheduled to begin on 9 August 2008, however the start of the league was delayed by a week due to a referees' strike. The season eventually began on 16 August 2008, and concluded on 2 May 2009. Linfield were the defending champions, but narrowly fell short of retaining the title as rivals Glentoran pipped them by a single point to win their 23rd league title overall.

== Team changes from 2007–08 ==
The league was reduced from sixteen to twelve teams as a result of the league system in Northern Ireland being restructured by the IFA.

Five of last season's sixteen Premier League teams failed to gain a place in the new twelve-team Premiership, and one new team - Bangor - gained entry from the IFA Intermediate League.

Of the five teams who missed out, three - Armagh City, Larne and Limavady United failed to obtain the necessary domestic licence. Portadown obtained a licence, but was controversially excluded because a club official missed a deadline for submitting an application form by several minutes. Finally, Donegal Celtic obtained a licence, but was ranked thirteenth in the entry list, and thus missed out by one place.

== Team overview ==
Location of teams in the 2008–09 IFA Premiership
Location of the Belfast-based teams in the 2008–09 IFA Premiership

Club	Stadium	Town/city	Capacity
Ballymena United	The Showgrounds	Ballymena	8,000 (4000 seats)
Bangor	Clandeboye Park	Bangor	4,000
Cliftonville	Solitude	Belfast	8,000 (2099 seats)
Coleraine	The Showgrounds	Coleraine	6,500 (1500 seats)
Crusaders	Seaview	Belfast	6,500
Dungannon Swifts	Stangmore Park	Dungannon	3,000 (300 seats)
Glenavon	Mourneview Park	Lurgan	5,500 (4000 seats)
Glentoran	The Oval	Belfast	15,250 (5000 seats)
Institute	YMCA Grounds	Drumahoe	4,000 (600 seats)
Linfield	Windsor Park	Belfast	20,400 (14,400 seats)
Lisburn Distillery	New Grosvenor Stadium	Lisburn	8,000 (2000 seats)
Newry City	The Showgrounds	Newry	6,500 (800 seats)

== League table ==
Pos	Team	Pld	W	D	L	GF	GA	GD	Pts	Qualification or relegation
1	Glentoran (C)	38	24	9	5	63	36	+27	81	Qualification to Champions League second qualifying round
2	Linfield	38	24	8	6	69	28	+41	80	Qualification to Europa League first qualifying round
3	Crusaders	38	16	14	8	63	45	+18	62	Qualification to Europa League second qualifying round (Note: Crusaders won the 2008–09 Irish Cup and qualified for the second qualifying round of the UEFA Europa League. Therefore the fourth placed team, Lisburn Distillery, also earned a spot in the Europa League.)
4	Lisburn Distillery	38	15	11	12	53	41	+12	56	Qualification to Europa League first qualifying round
5	Coleraine	38	15	6	17	46	51	−5	51	
6	Cliftonville	38	12	14	12	52	48	+4	50	
7	Institute	38	13	9	16	47	55	−8	48	
8	Newry City	38	11	11	16	47	57	−10	44	
9	Glenavon	38	11	8	19	49	63	−14	41	
10	Ballymena United	38	11	8	19	39	57	−18	41	
11	Dungannon Swifts (O)	38	8	11	19	49	71	−22	35	Qualification to Promotion/relegation play-off
12	Bangor (R)	38	9	9	20	42	67	−25	36	Relegation to IFA Championship 1 (Note: On 2 February 2009, Bangor announced that they would not be able to renew their domestic licence due to financial difficulties, and therefore would not compete in the 2009–10 IFA Premiership. Therefore, they were placed at the bottom of the league and thus automatically relegated, with Dungannon Swifts given a reprieve.)

Source: rsssf.com
Rules for classification: 1st points; 2nd goal difference; 3rd number of goals scored; 4th head-to-head points; 5th head-to-head goal difference
(C) Champions; (O) Play-off winners; (R) Relegated

== Results ==
=== Matches 1–22 ===
During matches 1–22 each team played every other team twice (home and away).

Home \ Away	BYM	BGR	CLI	COL	CRU	DUN	GLA	GLT	INS	LIN	LIS	NEW
Ballymena United		1–2	1–5	2–0	1–0	0–3	0–3	1–1	0–1	2–0	1–2	2–3
Bangor	0–3		1–1	4–0	0–5	3–1	1–2	1–2	3–2	0–5	1–0	1–1
Cliftonville	0–0	3–2		3–0	1–1	2–2	4–0	0–2	1–1	0–4	0–0	0–0
Coleraine	1–1	3–1	2–2		2–5	1–0	3–2	1–2	2–1	1–4	1–1	1–0
Crusaders	2–0	0–0	3–1	2–1		3–3	2–0	3–0	1–0	2–3	0–1	2–1
Dungannon Swifts	2–1	0–2	0–3	0–1	3–6		1–0	1–2	1–1	1–1	0–1	2–2
Glenavon	1–3	0–1	1–0	0–0	1–1	2–2		1–2	0–1	1–0	2–2	1–2
Glentoran	4–1	1–0	2–1	2–1	1–1	1–1	2–1		1–0	2–0	0–0	2–1
Institute	1–1	1–0	0–1	2–1	1–1	2–0	2–1	0–2		1–2	0–2	4–2
Linfield	1–0	0–0	2–1	1–0	1–0	3–1	2–4	3–0	7–0		0–2	1–0
Lisburn Distillery	1–0	1–0	3–1	1–2	1–2	0–1	6–2	1–1	5–2	1–2		1–1
Newry City	2–2	0–0	1–0	0–3	3–1	3–2	0–2	0–0	1–1	1–1	2–3	

Source: rsssf.com
Legend: Blue = home team win; Yellow = draw; Red = away team win.

=== Matches 23–33 ===
During matches 23–33 each team played every other team for the third time (either at home, or away).

Home \ Away	BYM	BGR	CLI	COL	CRU	DUN	GLA	GLT	INS	LIN	LIS	NEW
Ballymena United		2–0	1–3			1–2	1–2			0–3	1–0	
Bangor					1–4				2–2	0–1	0–0	4–2
Cliftonville		2–1				1–1	2–1	1–3		1–2	3–1	
Coleraine	0–1	3–1	0–0			2–1	2–1					
Crusaders	0–0		4–2	2–1		2–2	2–2					
Dungannon Swifts		3–2					1–1	0–2		0–1	1–4	1–2
Glenavon		2–3							1–3	1–4	1–0	2–0
Glentoran	1–2	3–1		1–3	1–1		2–0		4–2			
Institute	0–0		0–2	1–0	2–2	3–0						
Linfield				0–1	0–0			1–0	1–0			1–1
Lisburn Distillery				2–0	2–0			0–3	1–2	0–0		3–1
Newry City	0–1		0–1	0–4	0–1			0–1	2–1			

Source: rsssf.com
Legend: Blue = home team win; Yellow = draw; Red = away team win.

=== Matches 34–38 ===
During matches 34–38 each team played every other team in their half of the table once (either at home or away).

==== Section A ====
Home \ Away	CLI	COL	CRU	GLT	LIN	LIS
Cliftonville		0–0	0–0			
Coleraine			0–1	1–2	1–2	1–0
Crusaders				0–1	0–5	1–1
Glentoran	3–1				1–1	3–3
Linfield	2–2					2–0
Lisburn Distillery	1–1					

Source: rsssf.com
Legend: Blue = home team win; Yellow = draw; Red = away team win.

==== Section B ====
Home \ Away	BYM	BGR	DUN	GLA	INS	NEW
Ballymena United					1–0	0–4
Bangor	1–1		1–3	1–1		
Dungannon Swifts	4–3				0–1	
Glenavon	2–1		3–1			
Institute		4–0		1–1		1–3
Newry City		2–1	2–2	2–1		

Source: rsssf.com
Legend: Blue = home team win; Yellow = draw; Red = away team win.

== Promotion/relegation play-off ==
The relegation/promotion system was slightly modified because Bangor, who withdrew from the next IFA Premiership season, eventually finished 11th. It meant that last placed Dungannon Swifts played a two-legged match against Donegal Celtic, runners-up of the 2008–09 IFA Championship, for one spot in the 2009–10 IFA Premiership. The score was 2–2 on aggregate, but Dungannon Swifts secured their spot in the following IFA Premiership season by winning on away goals.

5 May 2009
19:45 BST

Donegal Celtic	2 – 1	Dungannon Swifts
Lyons 8'; McDonald 87'	Report	Adamson 50'

Donegal Celtic Park, Belfast

8 May 2009
19:45 BST

Dungannon Swifts	1 – 0	Donegal Celtic
Adamson 29'	Report

Stangmore Park, Dungannon

2–2 on aggregate. Dungannon Swifts won on away goals rule and remained in the IFA Premiership.
