= 2004–05 Irish First Division =

Irish First Division
- Champions: Armagh City
- Promoted: Armagh City; Glenavon
- Relegated: Ballinamallard United
- Matches played: 132
- Goals scored: 355 (2.69 per match)

Location of teams in the 2004–05 Irish First Division
Location of the Belfast-based teams in the 2004–05 Irish First Division

The 2004–05 Irish First Division was the tenth season of second-tier football in Northern Ireland under the league system at the time. The division consisted of 12 clubs.

Armagh City were the champions and were promoted to the 2005–06 Irish Premier League. Glenavon finished second and entered the promotion play-off, defeating Crusaders 3–2 on aggregate and gaining promotion. Ballinamallard United were relegated to the Irish Second Division. Ballymoney United were also due to be relegated, but were given a reprieve due to Omagh Town (who were relegated from the Premier League) going out of business.

== League table ==
Pos	Team	Pld	W	D	L	GF	GA	GD	Pts	Promotion or relegation
1	Armagh City (C, P)	22	15	7	0	35	11	+24	52	Promotion to Irish Premier League
2	Glenavon (P)	22	14	4	4	43	17	+26	46	Qualification to promotion play-off
3	Donegal Celtic	22	10	6	6	34	19	+15	36	
4	Harland & Wolff Welders	22	10	6	6	35	29	+6	36	
5	Bangor	22	9	6	7	33	29	+4	33	
6	Coagh United	22	8	5	9	39	42	−3	29	
7	Ballyclare Comrades	22	7	7	8	22	24	−2	28	
8	Dundela	22	7	6	9	28	33	−5	27	
9	Moyola Park	22	6	5	11	18	29	−11	23	
10	Carrick Rangers	22	6	4	12	25	37	−12	22	
11	Ballymoney United	22	6	2	14	29	45	−16	20	
12	Ballinamallard United (R)	22	3	4	15	14	40	−26	13	Relegation to Irish Second Division

Rules for classification: 1st points; 2nd goal difference; 3rd goals scored; 4th head-to-head points; 5th head-to-head goal difference
(C) Champions; (P) Promoted; (R) Relegated
