= 2004–05 Irish Premier League =

Irish Premier League
- Season: 2004–05
- Champions: Glentoran; 22nd Irish title
- Relegated: Crusaders; Omagh Town
- UEFA Champions League: Glentoran
- UEFA Cup: Linfield; Portadown
- UEFA Intertoto Cup: Lisburn Distillery
- Matches played: 240
- Top goalscorer: Chris Morgan (19 goals)

Location of teams in the 2004–05 Irish Premier League
Location of the Belfast-based teams in the 2004–05 Irish Premier League

The 2004–05 Irish Premier League was the 104th edition of the Irish League, the highest level of league competition in Northern Irish football, and the 2nd edition in its current format (as the Irish Premier League) since its inception in 2003. The league consisted of 16 teams, and Glentoran won the championship.

== Summary ==
Omagh Town were relegated after finishing bottom of the table and subsequently dissolved on 7 June 2005 owing to financial problems. Crusaders were relegated after a 3-1 defeat on aggregate to Glenavon in the promotion play-off.

Before the start of the season Newry Town changed name to Newry City following the change in official status of Newry in 2002.

== League standings ==
Pos	Team	Pld	W	D	L	GF	GA	GD	Pts	Qualification or relegation
1	Glentoran (C)	30	24	2	4	73	22	+51	74	Qualification to Champions League first qualifying round
2	Linfield	30	22	6	2	78	23	+55	72	Qualification to UEFA Cup first qualifying round
3	Portadown	30	18	4	8	64	29	+35	58	Qualification to UEFA Cup first qualifying round
4	Dungannon Swifts	30	15	5	10	57	39	+18	50	
5	Limavady United	30	13	9	8	52	36	+16	48	
6	Coleraine	30	14	5	11	62	47	+15	47	
7	Lisburn Distillery	30	13	8	9	49	42	+7	47	Qualification to Intertoto Cup first round
8	Ballymena United	30	11	12	7	40	37	+3	45	
9	Institute	30	11	3	16	36	50	−14	36	
10	Newry City	30	10	5	15	38	63	−25	35	
11	Cliftonville	30	9	7	14	29	44	−15	34	
12	Loughgall	30	8	6	16	34	53	−19	30	
13	Larne	30	7	7	16	31	60	−29	28	
14	Ards	30	6	8	16	33	54	−21	26	
15	Crusaders (R)	30	5	9	16	27	48	−21	24	Qualification to Promotion/relegation play-off
16	Omagh Town (R)	30	5	2	23	32	88	−56	17	Relegation to Irish First Division

Source: rsssf.com
Rules for classification: 1st points; 2nd goal difference; 3rd number of goals scored; 4th head-to-head points; 5th head-to-head goal difference
(C) Champions; (R) Relegated

== Results ==
Each team played every other team twice (home and away) for a total of 30 games.

Home \ Away	ARD	BYM	CLI	COL	CRU	DUN	GLT	INS	LRN	LIM	LIN	LIS	LOU	NEW	OMA	POR
Ards		1–1	3–0	1–2	2–2	1–3	0–3	1–2	0–3	0–1	2–2	0–1	0–0	5–1	2–0	0–1
Ballymena United	2–2		1–1	2–2	1–1	1–2	0–3	1–1	0–0	2–1	3–4	2–1	2–1	2–1	1–1	2–0
Cliftonville	3–1	0–0		1–4	1–0	1–1	0–1	1–0	2–0	0–2	0–0	1–0	1–3	0–1	2–1	0–2
Coleraine	3–0	0–2	3–1		1–1	4–2	0–1	2–4	3–0	1–2	0–4	1–3	2–0	6–1	3–4	2–2
Crusaders	0–2	2–3	0–2	1–1		0–3	0–2	1–0	1–1	1–0	1–2	0–0	3–2	0–1	3–1	0–1
Dungannon Swifts	7–0	1–2	3–1	0–1	0–0		2–0	3–0	3–1	1–1	1–1	1–1	1–0	1–0	2–0	1–3
Glentoran	2–0	4–2	4–0	1–0	4–1	5–0		2–0	3–0	2–0	3–2	1–0	2–0	3–1	3–0	1–2
Institute	1–1	1–1	1–2	3–1	2–0	3–2	0–1		3–0	0–3	0–1	1–3	3–0	2–1	0–1	2–1
Larne	2–2	0–0	0–0	1–5	5–2	3–2	0–5	2–0		0–4	0–2	0–0	2–3	0–1	2–0	2–3
Limavady United	0–1	2–1	0–0	0–3	1–1	3–2	2–2	5–1	6–0		0–1	2–2	1–1	3–2	2–0	0–2
Linfield	3–0	0–1	3–1	4–1	2–1	2–1	1–1	3–1	1–1	4–1		5–2	3–0	2–0	6–1	0–0
Lisburn Distillery	1–1	0–2	3–1	2–2	3–2	2–0	2–1	3–2	2–1	1–1	0–4		3–1	1–3	6–1	2–0
Loughgall	3–1	1–0	0–0	1–5	2–0	1–2	1–3	0–1	0–2	1–1	0–4	2–1		1–1	1–3	0–2
Newry City	1–0	1–1	4–2	0–1	2–0	0–4	0–4	4–1	1–3	2–2	0–3	0–0	2–5		2–1	0–6
Omagh Town	2–1	0–2	0–5	1–3	1–3	1–4	2–3	0–1	3–0	2–5	1–8	2–3	0–2	2–2		1–2
Portadown	2–3	3–0	3–0	2–0	0–0	1–2	4–3	4–0	3–0	0–1	0–1	2–1	2–2	2–3	9–0	

Source: Irish League Archive
Legend: Blue = home team win; Yellow = draw; Red = away team win.

== Promotion/relegation play-off ==
Crusaders, the club that finished in the relegation play-off place, faced Glenavon, the runners-up of the 2004–05 Irish First Division in a two-legged tie for a place in next season's Irish Premier League.

3 May 2005

Glenavon	1 – 1	Crusaders

Mourneview Park, Lurgan

6 May 2005

Crusaders	1 – 2 (a.e.t.)	Glenavon

Seaview, Belfast

Glenavon won 3–2 on aggregate and were promoted, Crusaders were relegated.
