= 2007–08 Irish First Division =

Irish First Division
- Champions: Loughgall
- Promoted: Bangor
- Relegated: Dundela; Harland & Wolff Welders; Lurgan Celtic; Portstewart
- Matches played: 132
- Goals scored: 376 (2.85 per match)

Location of teams in the 2007–08 Irish First Division

The 2007–08 Irish First Division was the thirteenth season of second-tier football in Northern Ireland under the league system at the time, and the last under this structure before a major overhaul of the league system. The 2007–08 First Division consisted of 12 clubs.

Loughgall were the champions, but were not promoted to the 2008–09 IFA Premiership as they did not apply for a place. Bangor finished fourth and were the only team from the First Division to apply for a place in the following season's top division, and were granted a place ahead of other incumbent top-flight clubs.

== League table ==
Pos	Team	Pld	W	D	L	GF	GA	GD	Pts	Promotion or relegation
1	Loughgall (C)	22	15	4	3	42	21	+21	49	
2	Dundela	22	12	3	7	38	28	+10	39	Outside relegation zone, but failed to qualify for IFA Championship
3	Ballyclare Comrades	22	11	5	6	25	13	+12	38	
4	Bangor	22	10	7	5	43	33	+10	37	Qualified for IFA Premiership
5	Tobermore United	22	10	5	7	41	32	+9	35	
6	Carrick Rangers	22	10	3	9	34	30	+4	33	
7	Banbridge Town	22	10	2	10	38	38	0	32	
8	Ards	22	8	3	11	32	28	+4	27	
9	Coagh United	22	7	6	9	27	35	−8	27	
10	Harland & Wolff Welders (R)	22	6	8	8	19	27	−8	26	Relegation to IFA Interim Intermediate League
11	Lurgan Celtic (R)	22	5	3	14	22	44	−22	18	Relegation to IFA Interim Intermediate League
12	Portstewart (R)	22	1	5	16	15	47	−32	8	Relegation to IFA Interim Intermediate League

Rules for classification: 1st points; 2nd goal difference; 3rd goals scored; 4th head-to-head points; 5th head-to-head goal difference
(C) Champions; (R) Relegated
