= 2013–14 Northern Ireland Football League =

Northern Ireland Football League
- Season: 2013–14
- Champions: Cliftonville
- Relegated: Chimney Corner (resigned); Killymoon Rangers

The 2013–14 Northern Ireland Football League was the first season of Northern Ireland's national football league running independently as the Northern Ireland Football League, consisting of the top three levels of the national league system, namely: the Premiership, Championship 1, and Championship 2. It was the 113th season of Irish league football overall. The season began on 9 August 2013 and concluded on 10 May 2014.

Cliftonville were the defending top-flight champions after winning their fourth league title the previous season – their first since the 1997–98 season. They went on to retain the title for the first time in the club's history to become the inaugural Northern Ireland Football League champions - their fourth outright league title and fifth overall.

For the first time since 2008, a club was relegated to level 4 (regional level). Killymoon Rangers finished bottom of Championship 2 and were relegated to a regional division for the following season. Also leaving Championship 2 was Chimney Corner. In July 2014, the club announced that they would be resigning from the Championship to join the Ballymena & Provincial League for the following season.

== Promotion and relegation ==
Promoted from Championship 1 to the Premiership

- Ards (1st in Championship 1)
- Warrenpoint Town (2nd in Championship 1 - play-off winners)

Relegated from the Premiership to Championship 1

- Donegal Celtic (11th in IFA Premiership - play-off losers)
- Lisburn Distillery (12th in IFA Premiership)

Promoted from Championship 2 to Championship 1

- Knockbreda (1st in Championship 2)
- Ballyclare Comrades (2nd in Championship 2)

Relegated from Championship 1 to Championship 2

- Tobermore United (13th in Championship 1)

Promoted from Northern Amateur Football League to Championship 2

- Newington YC (1st in NAFL Premier Division - promoted via play-off)

== League tables ==
=== Premiership ===
| Pos | Team | Pld | W | D | L | GF | GA | GD | Pts | Qualification or relegation |
|---|---|---|---|---|---|---|---|---|---|---|
| 1 | Cliftonville (C) | 38 | 26 | 7 | 5 | 88 | 39 | +49 | 85 | Qualification to Champions League second qualifying round |
| 2 | Linfield | 38 | 24 | 7 | 7 | 81 | 46 | +35 | 79 | Qualification to Europa League first qualifying round |
| 3 | Crusaders | 38 | 18 | 12 | 8 | 67 | 42 | +25 | 66 | Qualification to Europa League first qualifying round |
| 4 | Portadown | 38 | 18 | 8 | 12 | 77 | 53 | +24 | 62 | |
| 5 | Glentoran | 38 | 16 | 11 | 11 | 54 | 42 | +12 | 59 | |
| 6 | Glenavon | 38 | 15 | 6 | 17 | 75 | 79 | −4 | 51 | Qualification to Europa League first qualifying round (Note: Glenavon qualified for the 2014–15 UEFA Europa League first qualifying round by winning the 2013–14 Irish Cup.) |
| 7 | Ballymena United | 38 | 13 | 8 | 17 | 48 | 59 | −11 | 47 | |
| 8 | Dungannon Swifts | 38 | 12 | 8 | 18 | 49 | 66 | −17 | 44 | |
| 9 | Coleraine | 38 | 10 | 12 | 16 | 51 | 61 | −10 | 42 | |
| 10 | Ballinamallard United | 38 | 10 | 9 | 19 | 35 | 70 | −35 | 39 | |
| 11 | Warrenpoint Town | 38 | 10 | 6 | 22 | 43 | 72 | −29 | 36 | |
| 12 | Ards (R) | 38 | 6 | 6 | 26 | 44 | 83 | −39 | 24 | Relegation to NIFL Championship 1 |

Source: rsssf.com
Rules for classification: 1st points; 2nd goal difference; 3rd number of goals scored; 4th head-to-head points; 5th head-to-head goal difference
(C) Champions; (R) Relegated

=== Championship 1 ===
| Pos | Team | Pld | W | D | L | GF | GA | GD | Pts | Promotion or relegation |
|---|---|---|---|---|---|---|---|---|---|---|
| 1 | Institute (C, P) | 26 | 15 | 9 | 2 | 72 | 35 | +37 | 54 | Promotion to NIFL Premiership |
| 2 | Bangor (Note: Bangor were ineligible for the promotion play-off, as they did not attain the required licence for promotion.) | 26 | 16 | 5 | 5 | 65 | 39 | +26 | 53 | |
| 3 | Knockbreda | 26 | 14 | 4 | 8 | 57 | 36 | +21 | 46 | |
| 4 | Dundela | 26 | 14 | 4 | 8 | 65 | 47 | +18 | 46 | |
| 5 | Carrick Rangers | 26 | 14 | 4 | 8 | 52 | 34 | +18 | 46 | |
| 6 | Harland & Wolff Welders | 26 | 11 | 8 | 7 | 46 | 34 | +12 | 41 | |
| 7 | Ballyclare Comrades | 26 | 10 | 4 | 12 | 53 | 50 | +3 | 34 | |
| 8 | Loughgall | 26 | 9 | 6 | 11 | 48 | 56 | −8 | 33 | |
| 9 | Larne | 26 | 9 | 5 | 12 | 32 | 47 | −15 | 32 | |
| 10 | Lisburn Distillery | 26 | 8 | 7 | 11 | 43 | 49 | −6 | 31 | |
| 11 | Donegal Celtic | 26 | 8 | 5 | 13 | 41 | 55 | −14 | 29 | |
| 12 | Dergview | 26 | 6 | 8 | 12 | 30 | 46 | −16 | 26 | |
| 13 | Coagh United (R) | 26 | 5 | 6 | 15 | 38 | 74 | −36 | 21 | Relegation to NIFL Championship 2 |
| 14 | Limavady United (R) | 26 | 4 | 3 | 19 | 19 | 59 | −40 | 15 | Relegation to NIFL Championship 2 |

Source: rsssf.com
Rules for classification: 1st points; 2nd goal difference; 3rd goals scored; 4th head-to-head points; 5th head-to-head goal difference
(C) Champions; (P) Promoted; (R) Relegated

=== Championship 2 ===
| Pos | Team | Pld | W | D | L | GF | GA | GD | Pts | Promotion or relegation |
|---|---|---|---|---|---|---|---|---|---|---|
| 1 | Armagh City (C, P) | 30 | 25 | 2 | 3 | 90 | 26 | +64 | 77 | Promotion to NIFL Championship 1 |
| 2 | PSNI (P) | 30 | 20 | 6 | 4 | 84 | 28 | +56 | 66 | Promotion to NIFL Championship 1 |
| 3 | Queen's University | 30 | 19 | 6 | 5 | 47 | 32 | +15 | 63 | |
| 4 | Newington YC | 30 | 15 | 9 | 6 | 56 | 32 | +24 | 54 | |
| 5 | Annagh United | 30 | 15 | 7 | 8 | 75 | 53 | +22 | 52 | |
| 6 | Banbridge Town | 30 | 16 | 2 | 12 | 60 | 44 | +16 | 50 | |
| 7 | Moyola Park | 30 | 14 | 4 | 12 | 61 | 53 | +8 | 46 | |
| 8 | Portstewart | 30 | 12 | 7 | 11 | 52 | 46 | +6 | 43 | |
| 9 | Ballymoney United | 30 | 11 | 6 | 13 | 61 | 59 | +2 | 39 | |
| 10 | Tobermore United | 30 | 10 | 4 | 16 | 47 | 63 | −16 | 34 | |
| 11 | Glebe Rangers | 30 | 10 | 3 | 17 | 48 | 64 | −16 | 33 | |
| 12 | Lurgan Celtic | 30 | 9 | 6 | 15 | 41 | 67 | −26 | 33 | |
| 13 | Wakehurst | 30 | 7 | 6 | 17 | 47 | 75 | −28 | 27 | |
| 14 | Chimney Corner (R) | 30 | 7 | 2 | 21 | 38 | 75 | −37 | 23 | Resigned to join Ballymena & Provincial Regional league |
| 15 | Sport & Leisure Swifts | 30 | 5 | 7 | 18 | 37 | 70 | −33 | 22 | |
| 16 | Killymoon Rangers (R) | 30 | 5 | 3 | 22 | 33 | 90 | −57 | 18 | Relegation to Ballymena & Provincial Regional league |

Source: rsssf.com
Rules for classification: 1st points; 2nd goal difference; 3rd goals scored; 4th head-to-head points; 5th head-to-head goal difference
(C) Champions; (P) Promoted; (R) Relegated
