= 2005–06 Irish First Division =

Irish First Division
- Champions: Crusaders
- Promoted: Crusaders; Donegal Celtic
- Relegated: Ballyclare Comrades; Ballymoney United
- Matches played: 132
- Goals scored: 381 (2.89 per match)

Location of teams in the 2005–06 Irish First Division
Location of the Belfast-based teams in the 2005–06 Irish First Division

The 2005–06 Irish First Division was the eleventh season of second-tier football in Northern Ireland under the league system at the time. The 2005–06 First Division consisted of 12 clubs.

Crusaders were the champions and were promoted to the 2006–07 Irish Premier League. Donegal Celtic finished second and entered the promotion play-off, defeating Institute 3–1 on aggregate and gaining promotion. Ballyclare Comrades and Ballymoney United were relegated to the Irish Second Division.

== League table ==
Pos	Team	Pld	W	D	L	GF	GA	GD	Pts	Promotion or relegation
1	Crusaders (C, P)	22	20	1	1	51	13	+38	61	Promotion to Irish Premier League
2	Donegal Celtic (P)	22	13	5	4	41	25	+16	44	Qualification to promotion play-off
3	Dundela	22	10	5	7	32	28	+4	35	
4	Bangor	22	10	3	9	42	32	+10	33	
5	Banbridge Town	22	8	6	8	29	29	0	30	
6	Tobermore United	22	8	5	9	33	37	−4	29	
7	Carrick Rangers	22	8	4	10	25	29	−4	28	
8	Coagh United	22	8	3	11	25	26	−1	27	
9	Harland & Wolff Welders	22	7	4	11	21	31	−10	25	
10	Moyola Park	22	7	3	12	32	50	−18	24	
11	Ballyclare Comrades (R)	22	6	5	11	32	37	−5	23	Relegation to Irish Second Division
12	Ballymoney United (R)	22	3	4	15	18	44	−26	13	Relegation to Irish Second Division

Rules for classification: 1st points; 2nd goal difference; 3rd goals scored; 4th head-to-head points; 5th head-to-head goal difference
(C) Champions; (P) Promoted; (R) Relegated
