= 2010–11 IFA Premiership =

IFA Premiership
- Season: 2010–11
- Champions: Linfield; 2nd Premiership title 50th Irish title
- Relegated: Newry City
- UEFA Champions League: Linfield
- UEFA Europa League: Crusaders; Glentoran; Cliftonville
- Matches played: 228
- Goals scored: 681 (2.99 per match)
- Top goalscorer: Peter Thompson (23 goals)
- Biggest home win: Linfield 8–1 Crusaders
- Biggest away win: Lisburn Dist. 1–6 Glentoran
- Highest scoring: Linfield 8–1 Crusaders; Crusaders 5–4 Glenavon; Crusaders 4–5 Donegal Celtic

The 2010–11 IFA Premiership (known as the Carling Premiership for sponsorship reasons) was the 3rd season of the IFA Premiership, the highest level of league football in Northern Ireland, and the 110th season of Irish league football overall.

Linfield were champions, winning the league for the 50th time and the 2nd consecutive season.

== Summary ==
The season began on 7 August 2010, and concluded on 30 April 2011. Linfield were crowned champions for the second successive season, after a 4–0 win over Lisburn Distillery on 26 April 2011. This was Linfield's 50th Irish League title.

The same day, Newry City were relegated to IFA Championship 1 after a 4–0 loss to Glenavon.

== Teams ==
After a two-legged play-off against 2009–10 Championship 1 runners-up Donegal Celtic, Institute were relegated to the 2010–11 IFA Championship after an aggregate 1–0 loss, with Donegal Celtic taking their place for this season's IFA Premiership.

2009–10 IFA Championship 1 winners Loughgall were not eligible for promotion as they were not awarded the required domestic licence by the IFA.

=== Stadia and locations ===
Location of teams in the 2010–11 IFA Premiership
Location of the Belfast-based teams in the 2010–11 IFA Premiership

Club	Stadium	Location	Capacity
Ballymena United	The Showgrounds	Ballymena	1,418 (all seated)
Cliftonville	Solitude	Belfast	2,180 (1,878 seats)
Coleraine	The Showgrounds	Coleraine	2,496 (1,106 seats)
Crusaders	Seaview	Belfast	1,977 (663 seats)
Donegal Celtic	Donegal Celtic Park	Belfast	2,254 (988 seats)
Dungannon Swifts	Stangmore Park	Dungannon	5,000 (300 seats)
Glenavon	Mourneview Park	Lurgan	5,000 (4,000 seats)
Glentoran	The Oval	Belfast	5,056 (3,991 seats)
Linfield	Windsor Park	Belfast	12,342 (all seated)
Lisburn Distillery	New Grosvenor Stadium	Lisburn	7,000 (540 seats)
Newry City	The Showgrounds	Newry	2,275 (797 seats)
Portadown	Shamrock Park	Portadown	2,227 (all seated)

== League table ==
Pos	Team	Pld	W	D	L	GF	GA	GD	Pts	Qualification or relegation
1	Linfield (C)	38	26	7	5	80	29	+51	85	Qualification to Champions League second qualifying round
2	Crusaders	38	23	5	10	78	59	+19	74	Qualification to Europa League second qualifying round (Note: Crusaders qualified for the second qualifying round of the UEFA Europa League as they were the highest-placed Europa League qualifier, and 2010–11 Irish Cup winners Linfield had already qualified for the Champions League.)
3	Glentoran	38	20	6	12	63	41	+22	66	Qualification to Europa League first qualifying round
4	Cliftonville	38	17	7	14	60	56	+4	58	Qualification to Europa League first qualifying round
5	Portadown	38	15	5	18	49	58	−9	50	
6	Lisburn Distillery	38	14	6	18	50	66	−16	48	
7	Coleraine	38	17	5	16	51	50	+1	56 (Note: After 33 games, clubs in the bottom half of the table at the split cannot climb into the top half, regardless of the number of points earned during matches 34–38.)	
8	Dungannon Swifts	38	14	9	15	50	53	−3	51	
9	Ballymena United	38	12	13	13	48	56	−8	49	
10	Glenavon	38	12	9	17	60	59	+1	45	
11	Donegal Celtic	38	8	8	22	55	89	−34	32	
12	Newry City (R)	38	6	8	24	37	65	−28	26	Relegation to IFA Championship 1

Source: rsssf.com
Rules for classification: 1st points; 2nd goal difference; 3rd number of goals scored; 4th head-to-head points; 5th head-to-head goal difference
(C) Champions; (R) Relegated

== Results ==
=== Matches 1–22 ===
During matches 1–22 each team played every other team twice (home and away).

Home \ Away	BYM	CLI	COL	CRU	DGC	DUN	GLA	GLT	LIN	LIS	NEW	POR
Ballymena United		1–1	0–1	1–1	0–4	1–1	3–3	0–2	3–3	0–1	1–0	3–1
Cliftonville	5–0		0–2	2–1	4–2	2–0	0–2	2–1	3–1	1–3	2–1	0–1
Coleraine	1–0	3–1		0–3	4–0	0–3	0–2	1–2	0–2	0–1	2–0	1–3
Crusaders	2–1	1–3	2–0		4–5	1–1	5–4	1–0	2–1	1–2	2–1	3–1
Donegal Celtic	2–3	1–1	2–1	1–3		3–4	1–4	0–3	1–3	2–1	0–3	4–4
Dungannon Swifts	1–2	0–1	3–0	2–3	0–0		2–1	1–3	2–1	2–2	0–0	0–1
Glenavon	0–2	1–2	1–2	2–1	3–1	2–1		0–1	0–1	1–1	2–1	1–0
Glentoran	1–2	2–0	2–0	3–1	1–0	0–2	4–1		0–0	1–3	2–0	1–0
Linfield	0–0	0–0	1–0	8–1	6–2	1–0	1–0	2–1		1–0	4–0	4–0
Lisburn Distillery	1–1	1–1	0–3	2–4	1–3	4–1	2–2	1–6	0–4		2–1	2–0
Newry City	0–4	0–1	2–2	1–1	2–1	3–0	2–1	0–0	1–2	1–1		4–2
Portadown	1–3	2–1	2–0	0–2	3–0	2–2	2–2	0–1	1–2	1–0	4–2	

Source: rsssf.com
Legend: Blue = home team win; Yellow = draw; Red = away team win.

=== Matches 23–33 ===
During matches 23–33 each team played every other team for the third time (either at home, or away).

Home \ Away	BYM	CLI	COL	CRU	DGC	DUN	GLA	GLT	LIN	LIS	NEW	POR
Ballymena United			1–1	0–3	0–3			2–3				3–1
Cliftonville	2–2				2–2	3–2			2–4	3–2		1–3
Coleraine		3–2		1–3				3–1		1–2	3–1	1–1
Crusaders		5–0			2–1	2–2	1–0	2–1				
Donegal Celtic			1–1				3–3		2–0		0–0	0–2
Dungannon Swifts	1–0		1–0		3–1		2–2		0–4	1–2		
Glenavon	3–1	0–2	1–2						2–2	0–1	2–1	
Glentoran		0–0			4–0	0–0	2–2		1–2			0–1
Linfield	0–0		0–1	3–1						2–0	1–1	
Lisburn Distillery	0–1			0–1	3–1			0–2				2–1
Newry City	1–1	0–2		2–3		0–1		3–4		2–1		
Portadown				0–1		2–1	1–1		0–4		2–1	

Source: rsssf.com
Legend: Blue = home team win; Yellow = draw; Red = away team win.

=== Matches 34–38 ===
During matches 34–38 each team played every other team in their half of the table once. As this was the fourth time that teams played each other this season, home sides in this round were chosen so that teams had played each other twice at home and twice away.

==== Section A ====
Home \ Away	CLI	CRU	GLT	LIN	LIS	POR
Cliftonville		3–0	1–2			
Crusaders				0–1	4–1	3–1
Glentoran		2–2			2–1	
Linfield	1–0		3–2			1–0
Lisburn Distillery	4–3			0–4		
Portadown	0–1		2–0		1–0	

Source: rsssf.com
Legend: Blue = home team win; Yellow = draw; Red = away team win.

==== Section B ====
Home \ Away	BYM	COL	DGC	DUN	GLA	NEW
Ballymena United				0–2	1–0	1–0
Coleraine	1–1		3–1	2–1	3–1	
Donegal Celtic	3–3			1–2		
Dungannon Swifts						1–0
Glenavon			3–0	1–2		
Newry City		0–2	0–1		0–4	

Source: rsssf.com
Legend: Blue = home team win; Yellow = draw; Red = away team win.

== Promotion/relegation ==
The promotion/relegation play-off was not played this season, because Championship 1 runners-up Limavady United were not eligible for promotion as they did not hold a domestic licence. This meant that Newry City were automatically relegated, with Championship 1 winners Carrick Rangers replacing them in next season's Premiership.

== Top goalscorers ==
Rank	Scorer	Club	Goals
1	(Northern Ireland) Peter Thompson	Linfield	23
2	(Northern Ireland) Paul McVeigh	Donegal Celtic	19
2	(Northern Ireland) Jordan Owens	Crusaders	19
4	(Northern Ireland) Daryl Fordyce	Glentoran	17
5	(Northern Ireland) Stuart Dallas	Crusaders	16
6	(Northern Ireland) Matthew Burrows	Glentoran	15
7	(England) Leon Knight	Coleraine	14
7	(Scotland) Gary McCutcheon	Ballymena United	14
9	(Northern Ireland) Gary Hamilton	Glenavon	13
9	(Northern Ireland) Ryan Henderson	Donegal Celtic	13
