= 2022–23 Glenavon F.C. season =

Glenavon
2022–23 season
- Chairman: Adrian Teer
- Manager: Gary Hamilton
- Stadium: Mourneview Park, Lurgan; County Armagh
- Top goalscorer: League: Matthew Fitzpatrick (19); All: Matthew Fitzpatrick (20)

The 2022–23 season is Glenavon's 103rd season in the top flight of the Northern Ireland Football League. In addition to the domestic league, the team competed in the Irish Cup, the League Cup and the Mid-Ulster Cup. Gary Hamilton continued in the managerial role, having been appointed in 2011.

Glenavon finished seventh in the 2022–23 NIFL Premiership league table. As a result of its placing in the table, the club qualified for the play-offs for qualification to the first qualifying round of the 2023–24 Europa Conference League. In the semi-finals of the playoffs, the team lost to Glentoran. Glenavon was eliminated in the sixth round of the 2022–23 Irish Cup by second tier side Harland & Wolff Welders. In the League Cup, the team lost to championship side Loughgall in the second round.

== Pre-season and friendlies ==
Glenavon played eight pre-season friendlies before the start of the regular season, winning seven and losing one.

Date	Opponents	Home/Away	Result	Score	Source
16 July 2022	Loughgall	Away	Won	2-1	
19 July 2022	Bangor	Away	Won	7-3	
28 July 2022	Harland & Wolff Welders	Away	Won	2-1	
30 July 2022	Dergview	Home	Won	3-1	
3 August 2022	Armagh City	Away	Won	1-0	
4 August 2022	Ballyclare Comrades	Away	Lost	1-2	
6 August 2022	Annagh United	Home	Won	2-1	
10 August 2022	Dollingstown	Home	Won	2-0	

== Personnel ==
Gary Hamilton continued in the managerial role, having been appointed in 2011. The squad consisted of largely Northern Irish men with the exception of two from Ireland. The team brought back Eoin Bradley from Coleraine. The team sold 14 players including Nigerian Sodiq Oguntola, who was brought in during the same transfer window. Andrew Waterworth announced his retirement, and Danny Purkis was released from this contract before the season.

== Competitions ==
=== Overall Record ===
Match Results
Competition	First Match	Last Match	Final Position	Record						
Competition	First Match	Last Match	Final Position	Pld	Win	Draw	Loss	GF	GA	GD
NIFL Premiership	14 August 2022	29 April 2023	7th Place	38	14	10	14	58	61	–3
Irish Cup	7 January 2023	4 February 2023	6th Round	2	1	0	1	2	2	0
NIFL League Cup	13 September 2022	4 October 2022	2nd Round	2	1	0	1	7	2	5
Mid-Ulster Cup	6 September 2022	11 October 2022	Quarter-Final	2	1	0	1	6	6	0
Total				44	17	10	17	73	71	+2

=== NIFL Premiership ===
In the opening match of the 2022–23 NIFL Premiership season, Glenavon started with a draw against Ballymena United. The team struggled for form early in the season, and won just two games in the first ten games of the season. The team recovered to score five wins before the mid-season Christmas break. However, the team went on another poor run with six losses in ten matches across January and February. The club finished the season strongly including seven victories in eight matches to end up seventh in the final league table.

Clubs that finish in 3rd–7th place in the table competed for one place in the 2023–24 Europa Conference League first qualifying round. In the semi-finals, Glenavon lost to Glentoran and failed to win a place in the 2023–24 UEFA Europa Conference League.

==== League Table ====
Pos	Team	Pld	W	D	L	GF	GA	GD	Pts	Qualification or relegation (Note: Teams play each other three times (33 matches), before the league is split into two groups (the top six and the bottom six).)
1	Larne (C)	38	25	8	5	64	22	+42	83	Qualification for the Champions League first qualifying round
2	Linfield	38	23	8	7	75	27	+48	77	Qualification for the Europa Conference League first qualifying round
3	Glentoran (O)	38	23	5	10	77	28	+49	74	Qualification for the Europa Conference League play-offs (Note: Glentoran entered the Europa Conference League first qualifying round as play-off winners.)
4	Cliftonville	38	20	8	10	66	53	+13	68	Qualification for the Europa Conference League play-offs
5	Crusaders	38	19	10	9	72	45	+27	67	Qualification for the Europa Conference League first qualifying round (Note: Crusaders entered the Europa Conference League first qualifying round as 2022–23 Irish Cup winners.)
6	Coleraine	38	18	8	12	59	39	+20	62	Qualification for the Europa Conference League play-offs
7	Glenavon	38	14	10	14	58	61	−3	52	Qualification for the Europa Conference League play-offs
8	Carrick Rangers	38	12	4	22	45	74	−29	40	
9	Ballymena United	38	11	6	21	37	55	−18	39	
10	Newry City	38	9	3	26	37	71	−34	30	
11	Dungannon Swifts (O)	38	9	3	26	28	84	−56	30	Qualification for the NIFL Premiership play-off
12	Portadown (R)	38	6	5	27	29	88	−59	23	Relegation to the NIFL Championship

Source: Northern Ireland Football League, Soccerway
Rules for classification: 1) Points; 2) Goal difference; 3) Number of goals scored; 4) Head-to-head points; 5) Head-to-head goal difference; 6) Drawing of lots
(C) Champions; (O) Play-off winners; (R) Relegated

=== Irish Cup ===
In the 2022–23 Irish Cup, Glenavon entered in the fifth round against Ballinamallard United. After winning the match narrowly by two late goals in the injury time, the team faced second-tier club Harland & Wolff Welders in the next round. In the sixth round, Glenavon lost by a solitary goal and crashed out of the competition.

7 January 2023
5:00 p.m. GMT
5th Round

Ballinamallard United	1−2	Glenavon
C. McAleer 80'	Report	P. Campbell 90+1'; M. Fitzpatrick 90+3'

Ferney Park, Ballinamallard
4 February 2023
5:00 p.m. GMT
6th Round

Glenavon	0−1	Harland & Wolff Welders
	Report	Barr 56'

Mourneview Park, Lurgan

=== NIFL League Cup ===
In the 2022–23 Northern Ireland Football League Cup, Glenavon beat Dollingstown in the first round by six goals. In the second round, the team lost to championship club Loughgall and bowed out of the competition.

14 September 2022
First Round

Glenavon	6−0	Dollingstown
	Report

Mourneview Park, Lurgan
5 October 2022
Second Round

Glenavon	1−2	Loughgall
Malone 90+3'	Report	Andrade 47'; Patton 86'

Mourneview Park, Lurgan
