= 2009–10 IFA Premiership =

IFA Premiership
- Season: 2009–10
- Champions: Linfield; 1st Premiership title 49th Irish title
- Relegated: Institute
- UEFA Champions League: Linfield
- UEFA Europa League: Cliftonville; Glentoran; Portadown
- Matches played: 228
- Goals scored: 676 (2.96 per match)
- Top goalscorer: Rory Patterson (30 goals)
- Biggest home win: Portadown 6–1 Lisburn Distillery
- Biggest away win: Dungannon Swifts 2–8 Portadown; Newry City 0–6 Linfield; Glentoran 0–6 Coleraine
- Highest scoring: Dungannon Swifts 2–8 Portadown

The 2009–10 IFA Premiership (known as the Carling Premiership for sponsorship reasons) was the 2nd season of the IFA Premiership, the highest level of league football in Northern Ireland, and the 109th season of Irish league football overall.

Linfield were champions, winning the league for the 49th time.

== Summary ==
It began on 8 August 2009 and ended on 1 May 2010. Glentoran were the defending champions. On 27 April 2010, Linfield clinched the title after a 1–0 victory against Cliftonville at Windsor Park. On 14 May 2010, Institute were relegated to the 2010–11 IFA Championship, after losing the two-legged relegation play-off to Donegal Celtic, who took their place in the 2010–11 IFA Premiership.

== Team changes from 2008–09 ==
On 2 February 2009, Bangor's board announced that they would not be able to renew their domestic licence due to financial difficulties, and thereby would not compete in this season's premiership. They finished the 2008–09 season in 11th place. As a consequence, 12th-placed Dungannon Swifts, who were originally going to be directly relegated to the IFA Championship, earned the relegation play-off berth from Bangor. After a two-legged series against 2008–09 Championship runners-up Donegal Celtic, which ended in an aggregated 2–2 tie, Dungannon eventually retained their Premiership status on away goals.

Promoted from the Championship were 2008–09 champions Portadown, which marked their return to the highest football league of Northern Ireland after a one-year hiatus.

== Stadia and locations ==
Location of teams in the 2009–10 IFA Premiership
Location of the Belfast-based teams in the 2009–10 IFA Premiership

Club	Stadium	Town/city	Capacity
Ballymena United	The Showgrounds	Ballymena	8,000 (4,000 seats)
Cliftonville	Solitude	Belfast	8,000 (2,099 seats)
Coleraine	The Showgrounds	Coleraine	6,500 (1,500 seats)
Crusaders	Seaview	Belfast	6,500 (500 seats)
Dungannon Swifts	Stangmore Park	Dungannon	3,000 (300 seats)
Glenavon	Mourneview Park	Lurgan	5,500 (4,000 seats)
Glentoran	The Oval	Belfast	15,250 (5,000 seats)
Institute	YMCA Grounds	Drumahoe	4,000 (600 seats)
Linfield	Windsor Park	Belfast	20,400 (14,400 seats)
Lisburn Distillery	New Grosvenor Stadium	Lisburn	8,000 (2,000 seats)
Newry City	The Showgrounds	Newry	6,500 (800 seats)
Portadown	Shamrock Park	Portadown	8,000 (3,500 seats)

== League table ==
Pos	Team	Pld	W	D	L	GF	GA	GD	Pts	Qualification or relegation
1	Linfield (C)	38	22	8	8	78	37	+41	74	Qualification to Champions League second qualifying round
2	Cliftonville	38	21	6	11	69	42	+27	69	Qualification to Europa League second qualifying round
3	Glentoran	38	19	8	11	58	46	+12	65	Qualification to Europa League first qualifying round
4	Crusaders	38	17	9	12	57	52	+5	60	
5	Dungannon Swifts	38	16	9	13	56	58	−2	57	
6	Portadown	38	15	10	13	70	55	+15	55	Qualification to Europa League first qualifying round (Note: Portadown qualified for the first qualifying round of the 2010–11 UEFA Europa League as 2009–10 Irish Cup runners-up, since winners Linfield had already qualified for the Champions League. As a result, Cliftonville were promoted to the second qualifying round)
7	Coleraine	38	16	9	13	76	62	+14	57 (Note: After 33 games, clubs in the bottom half of the table at the split cannot climb into the top half, regardless of the number of points earned during matches 34–38.)	
8	Glenavon	38	12	7	19	47	67	−20	43	
9	Newry City	38	10	12	16	38	63	−25	42	
10	Ballymena United	38	11	7	20	46	56	−10	40	
11	Lisburn Distillery	38	11	6	21	45	76	−31	39	
12	Institute (R)	38	6	13	19	36	62	−26	31	Qualification to Promotion/relegation play-off

Source: RSSSF.com
Rules for classification: 1st points; 2nd goal difference; 3rd number of goals scored; 4th head-to-head points; 5th head-to-head goal difference.
(C) Champions; (R) Relegated

== Results ==
=== Matches 1–22 ===
During matches 1–22 each team played every other team twice (home and away).

Home \ Away	BYM	CLI	COL	CRU	DUN	GLA	GLT	INS	LIN	LIS	NEW	POR
Ballymena United		0–1	3–2	1–2	0–1	0–3	2–3	1–1	2–0	0–1	1–2	2–1
Cliftonville	0–2		0–1	1–2	1–0	3–2	1–2	4–1	4–0	3–0	3–2	2–1
Coleraine	3–2	3–3		4–1	2–1	3–0	0–1	3–1	2–2	2–1	3–0	3–3
Crusaders	2–2	2–3	1–0		2–3	3–0	1–1	1–2	0–4	2–0	1–1	3–1
Dungannon Swifts	2–1	1–1	1–0	1–2		4–0	1–1	2–1	2–2	2–1	0–0	2–8
Glenavon	2–2	3–2	3–2	1–1	3–2		2–2	0–1	1–2	2–1	1–1	2–2
Glentoran	1–2	2–1	0–6	0–1	0–0	2–0		1–1	2–2	1–0	0–1	1–0
Institute	0–1	1–1	2–2	1–0	0–1	0–1	0–3		1–2	2–1	0–0	1–1
Linfield	1–0	1–2	2–4	0–1	1–0	4–1	2–1	2–2		2–0	3–0	1–1
Lisburn Distillery	0–2	0–5	3–2	0–1	0–0	2–3	0–4	2–1	1–2		2–4	0–3
Newry City	3–2	1–2	2–1	0–1	0–1	0–3	1–2	3–1	0–6	0–1		0–0
Portadown	2–0	2–2	4–0	1–2	1–4	2–0	1–2	0–0	1–0	6–1	0–0	

Source: RSSSF.com
Legend: Blue = home team win; Yellow = draw; Red = away team win.

=== Matches 23–33 ===
During matches 23–33 each team played every other team for the third time (either at home, or away).

Home \ Away	BYM	CLI	COL	CRU	DUN	GLA	GLT	INS	LIN	LIS	NEW	POR
Ballymena United		2–1		2–0		1–0					0–0	0–1
Cliftonville			0–1				1–2	3–0	1–1	1–0		
Coleraine	3–1						4–3	1–1	1–3	1–3		
Crusaders		1–2	2–5			3–0					4–1	3–2
Dungannon Swifts	2–1	0–2	1–1	1–1			2–0					4–4
Glenavon		0–2	2–1		1–3		1–3				1–0	0–1
Glentoran	3–0			0–0				2–1	2–2	2–0		
Institute	2–2			1–3	2–0	1–2			0–3	2–3		
Linfield	1–0			2–0	4–1	1–2					5–0	5–0
Lisburn Distillery	2–2			2–2	2–5	0–0			0–5		3–0	
Newry City		1–1	0–0		4–0		0–3	0–0				1–5
Portadown		2–0	3–1				2–1	3–1		1–3		

Source: RSSSF.com
Legend: Blue = home team win; Yellow = draw; Red = away team win.

=== Matches 34–38 ===
During matches 34–38 each team played every other team in their half of the table once. As this was the fourth time that teams played each other this season, home sides in this round were chosen so that teams had played each other twice at home and twice away.

==== Section A ====
Home \ Away	CLI	CRU	DUN	GLT	LIN	POR
Cliftonville		1–0	4–1			2–1
Crusaders			2–3	2–1	0–0	
Dungannon Swifts					0–1	
Glentoran	0–3		1–0			2–0
Linfield	1–0			3–1		
Portadown		2–2	1–2		1–0	

Source: RSSSF.com
Legend: Blue = home team win; Yellow = draw; Red = away team win.

==== Section B ====
Home \ Away	BYM	COL	GLA	INS	LIS	NEW
Ballymena United		2–4		3–0	1–2	
Coleraine			1–0			2–3
Glenavon	1–1			1–2	1–3	
Institute		1–1				1–1
Lisburn Distillery		1–1		2–1		
Newry City	1–0		3–2		2–2	

Source: RSSSF.com
Legend: Blue = home team win; Yellow = draw; Red = away team win.

== Top scorers ==
Rank	Scorer	Club	Goals
1	(Northern Ireland) Rory Patterson	Coleraine	30
2	(Northern Ireland) Darren Boyce	Coleraine	17
2	(Northern Ireland) George McMullan	Cliftonville	17
4	(Northern Ireland) Liam Boyce	Cliftonville	16
5	(Northern Ireland) Kevin Braniff	Portadown	14
5	(Northern Ireland) Richard Lecky	Portadown	14
5	(Northern Ireland) David Rainey	Crusaders	14
5	(Northern Ireland) Glenn Ferguson	Lisburn Distillery	14
9	(Northern Ireland) Timmy Adamson	Dungannon Swifts	13
10	(Scotland) Gary McCutcheon	Portadown	12

== Promotion/relegation play-off ==
The promotion/relegation play-off was slightly altered this season because Donegal Celtic, runners-up of the 2009–10 IFA Championship, were the only IFA Championship club to hold the Domestic Club Licence required to participate in the Premiership. Lisburn Distillery, who finished in 11th place, avoided having to play a relegation play-off, which was passed down instead to Institute, who finished in 12th place and would normally have been automatically relegated. The first leg ended 0-0, with Institute having a penalty saved in injury-time at the end of the game. The second leg stayed goalless until the 85th minute, when Stephen McAlorum scored for Donegal Celtic, to relegate Institute to the 2010–11 IFA Championship.

11 May 2010
19:45 BST

Donegal Celtic	0 – 0	Institute
	Report

Donegal Celtic Park, Belfast

14 May 2010
19:45 BST

Institute	0 – 1	Donegal Celtic
	Report	McAlorum 85'

YMCA Grounds, Drumahoe

Donegal Celtic won 1–0 on aggregate and were promoted, Institute were relegated
