= Pat McAllister =

Northern irish footballer (born 1972)

Patrick McAllister ‘Pat’ or ‘Packie’(born 3 February 1972) is a Northern Irish former football midfielder and former assistant coach and manager. His previous roles in football was as manager of Donegal Celtic, where he resigned in August 2013, caretaker manager of Glenavon and Sport & Leisure Swifts (now Belfast Celtic), which he resigned at the end of the 2018/19 season. His most recent management was of St. James Swifts, who currently play in the NCL Premier, as of the 26/27 season and he resigned of his position of manager midway through the 19/20 season as he wanted to take a step away from football, due to personal reasons.

== Playing career ==
A native of Belfast, McAllister began his career at Cliftonville. After making only six league appearances for the Reds, McAllister caught the eye of Scottish Premier Division side Dunfermline Athletic, who signed him in July 1990. Although McAllister remained at East End Park for two and a half seasons he made little impact at the club, managing only six Premier Division appearances for Dunfermline.

In August 1992 McAllister was loaned back to Cliftonville, making three league appearances. In December 1992 the move was made permanent, with McAllister making 60 league appearances (eight goals) for the club. During this time McAllister turned out for the Irish League representative team, having previously played for the league's under-21 side earlier in his career.

=== Coleraine ===
In 1995 manager Kenny Shiels brought McAllister to Coleraine for £32,000, a record transfer fee for the Showgrounds club. He was a key member of the Coleraine side that won the 1995–96 First Division title by some distance whilst also capturing the Ulster Cup. A popular figure with the club's supporters, McAllister acted as captain for much of his ten years at the Showgrounds and demonstrated his versatility by playing across the defence and even as an emergency keeper, most notably during the 2000 Gold Cup final. McAllister put in a man of the match performance during the 2003 Irish Cup final as Coleraine secured victory. With Coleraine qualifying for the 2003–04 UEFA Cup, McAllister put in another man of the match showing as the club shocked Portuguese club U.D. Leiria 2–1 in their First Round First Leg tie. However, he missed the Irish Cup final in 2004 due to suspension, with disciplinary problems a feature of his time at the club. His final appearance was a league match against Portadown on 8 April 2005 and McAllister finished with 335 appearances and 42 goals for the Coleraine first team. He finished his playing career at Donegal Celtic.

== Coaching career ==
In 2009 Donegal Celtic manager Paddy Kelly left the club and McAllister was appointed as his replacement. The move proved a success as the club were promoted to the IFA Premiership at the end of his first season in charge, defeating Institute in a play-off. However, despite this success McAllister quit as manager during the summer of 2010 for personal reasons and was replaced by Marty Tabb.

He served for a spell as assistant manager at Glenavon, although his contract was allowed to expire in May 2012 and he left the Lurgan club.

In October 2012 McAllister returned to the manager's position at Donegal Celtic when it became apparent that Declan McGreevy, who had only recently replaced Stephen Small as manager, did not possess the necessary coaching qualifications to work at that level. His first game back in charge was 26 October away tie against Glentoran. McAllister's second spell at the club was considerably less successful than his first as Donegal Celtic were relegated following a play-off defeat at the hands of Warrenpoint Town F.C. In the immediate aftermath of this result McAllister suggested that he was considering his future but did not quit. However, on 4 August 2013 McAllister once again announced his resignation as Donegal Celtic manager, stating that the club could not match his ambitions, after reports were released suggesting that they would be paying neither wages nor expenses to players in the coming season. Following his resignation several players and the chairman also departed the club.

McAllister returned to coaching during the 2013–14 season when he took charge of Sport & Leisure Swifts F.C. with the club lying bottom of the NIFL Championship 2. Although the club continued to struggle for much of the remainder of the season victory in their final day match against Chimney Corner F.C. ensured their survival. Following the confirmation of the club's survival McAllister was confirmed as manager for the 2014–15 season.
