= 2006–07 Irish First Division =

Irish First Division
- Champions: Institute
- Promoted: Institute
- Relegated: Ballinamallard United; Moyola Park
- Matches played: 132
- Goals scored: 425 (3.22 per match)

Location of teams in the 2006–07 Irish First Division

The 2006–07 Irish First Division was the twelfth season of second-tier football in Northern Ireland under the league system at the time. The 2006–07 First Division consisted of 12 clubs.

Institute were the champions and were promoted to the 2007–08 Irish Premier League. Bangor finished second and entered the promotion play-off, but lost 1–0 on aggregated to Glenavon who retained their place in the top tier. Ballinamallard United and Moyola Park were relegated to the Irish Second Division.

== League table ==
Pos	Team	Pld	W	D	L	GF	GA	GD	Pts	Promotion or relegation
1	Institute (C, P)	22	17	3	2	50	14	+36	54	Promotion to Irish Premier League
2	Bangor	22	14	5	3	49	23	+26	47	Qualification to promotion play-off
3	Banbridge Town	22	13	4	5	45	31	+14	43	
4	Carrick Rangers	22	12	6	4	38	27	+11	42	
5	Ards	22	11	5	6	42	25	+17	38	
6	Dundela	22	8	5	9	33	35	−2	29	
7	Harland & Wolff Welders	22	8	3	11	30	36	−6	27	
8	Coagh United	22	6	6	10	32	41	−9	24	
9	Tobermore United	22	5	5	12	39	54	−15	20	
10	Portstewart	22	6	2	14	29	44	−15	20	
11	Ballinamallard United (R)	22	4	3	15	14	42	−28	15	Relegation to Irish Second Division
12	Moyola Park (R)	22	4	1	17	24	53	−29	13	Relegation to Irish Second Division

Rules for classification: 1st points; 2nd goal difference; 3rd goals scored; 4th head-to-head points; 5th head-to-head goal difference
(C) Champions; (P) Promoted; (R) Relegated
