= Berraat Türker =

German footballer (born 1991 in Hannover, Germany)

Personal information
- Date of birth: 4 October 1991 (age 35)
- Place of birth: Germany
- Position: Goalkeeper

Team information
- Current team: Loughgall
- Number: 31

Senior career*
| Years | Team | Apps | (Gls) |
| 2014 | Dungannon Swifts | 5 | (0) |
| 2017–2020 | Warrenpoint Town | 32 | (0) |
| 2020– | Loughgall | 114 | (0) |
- * Club domestic league appearances and goals as of 29 April 2026

Berraat Türker (born 4 October 1991) is a German footballer who plays as a goalkeeper for Loughgall.

== Early life ==
He is the son of a Turkish mother and German father.

== Career ==
He plays for Northern Irish side Loughgall, having helped the club achieve promotion. He previously played for NIFL Premiership sides Dungannon Swifts and Warrenpoint Town.

== Style of play ==
He mainly operated as a striker as a youth player before switching to goalkeeper.

== Personal life ==
He has worked as a model.
