= 2005–06 Irish Premier League =

Irish Premier League
- Season: 2005–06
- Champions: Linfield; 46th Irish title
- Relegated: Institute; Ards
- UEFA Champions League: Linfield
- UEFA Cup: Glentoran; Portadown
- UEFA Intertoto Cup: Dungannon Swifts
- Matches: 240
- Top goalscorer: Peter Thompson (25 goals)

The 2005–06 Irish Premier League was the 105th edition of the Irish League, the highest level of league competition in Northern Irish football, and the 3rd edition in its current format (as the Irish Premier League) since its inception in 2003. The league consisted of 16 teams, and Linfield won the championship.

== Summary ==
Ards were relegated after finishing bottom of the table, and Institute were relegated after a 3–1 defeat on aggregate to Donegal Celtic in the promotion play-off.

Location of teams in the 2005–06 Irish Premier League
Location of the Belfast-based teams in the 2005–06 Irish Premier League

== League table ==
Pos	Team	Pld	W	D	L	GF	GA	GD	Pts	Qualification or relegation
1	Linfield (C)	30	23	6	1	88	23	+65	75	Qualification to Champions League first qualifying round
2	Glentoran	30	19	6	5	60	28	+32	63	Qualification to UEFA Cup first qualifying round
3	Portadown	30	16	6	8	56	36	+20	54	Qualification to UEFA Cup first qualifying round
4	Dungannon Swifts	30	13	10	7	61	41	+20	49	Qualification to Intertoto Cup first round
5	Cliftonville	30	13	8	9	45	35	+10	47	
6	Newry City	30	12	9	9	45	35	+10	45	
7	Ballymena United	30	13	6	11	42	48	−6	45	
8	Lisburn Distillery	30	12	8	10	44	38	+6	44	
9	Coleraine	30	11	4	15	40	57	−17	37	
10	Limavady United	30	9	9	12	42	49	−7	36	
11	Loughgall	30	9	7	14	33	38	−5	34	
12	Larne	30	7	9	14	42	63	−21	30	
13	Glenavon	30	7	9	14	35	59	−24	30	
14	Armagh City	30	9	3	18	38	69	−31	30	
15	Institute (R)	30	6	8	16	37	58	−21	26	Qualification to Promotion/relegation play-off
16	Ards (R)	30	6	2	22	31	62	−31	20	Relegation to Irish First Division

Source: rsssf.com
Rules for classification: 1st points; 2nd goal difference; 3rd number of goals scored; 4th head-to-head points; 5th head-to-head goal difference
(C) Champions; (R) Relegated

== Results ==
Each team played every other team twice (home and away) for a total of 30 games.

Home \ Away	ARD	ARM	BYM	CLI	COL	DUN	GLA	GLT	INS	LRN	LIM	LIN	LIS	LOU	NEW	POR
Ards		0–2	1–3	0–1	2–5	3–3	1–0 (Note: The match between Ards and Glenavon (originally finished 0–3) was rated 1–0 due to the use of a player who was not eligible to play.)	0–1	1–4	1–3	2–1	0–4	0–1	1–0	1–3	1–2
Armagh City	3–0		0–1	1–3	3–0	0–0	0–4	5–2	1–2	1–2	3–3	0–1	1–6	0–1	2–1	2–2
Ballymena United	1–1	3–0		0–2	1–0	4–3	2–3	0–4	1–0	1–0	1–3	0–2	1–0	3–2	0–0	2–3
Cliftonville	0–1	8–1	2–2		0–1	0–3	2–1	1–1	2–0	2–2	0–1	1–1	2–1	1–0	0–0	0–2
Coleraine	2–4	4–0	0–1	0–2		2–0	0–0	0–0	2–5	2–1	0–2	0–1	1–0	1–3	1–3	1–1
Dungannon Swifts	4–2	2–1	2–2	1–0	6–1		6–0	2–1	2–1	3–0	3–2	2–3	2–2	3–0	1–1	0–1
Glenavon	1–0	1–3	2–2	2–2	1–2	2–2		0–3	0–0	2–3	2–1	0–5	2–2	0–4	1–4	0–1
Glentoran	2–1	2–0	1–2	0–0	3–0	3–1	1–0		3–1	5–1	0–1	1–4	0–0	1–0	3–2	5–1
Institute	2–1	4–0	0–1	2–3	0–1	3–3	1–2	1–3		1–1	1–1	2–9	0–2	0–0	0–0	1–2
Larne	3–1	2–3	1–2	2–4	1–4	1–0	2–2	1–3	1–1		2–3	2–4	3–1	0–0	1–1	2–1
Limavady United	1–0	3–0	2–2	1–2	3–3	1–1	1–1	0–2	3–3	1–0		2–2	1–1	0–1	1–4	0–2
Linfield	2–0	5–0	3–2	1–0	7–2	1–1	2–1	0–0	2–0	8–1	2–0		1–3	2–0	3–1	4–0
Lisburn Distillery	1–0	3–1	2–1	0–0	1–2	0–0	1–2	1–4	4–1	3–1	1–2	0–6		2–3	0–0	1–0
Loughgall	2–3	2–1	1–0	2–3	2–3	0–1	1–1	2–3	2–0	1–1	2–1	1–2	0–0		0–3	0–0
Newry City	2–1	1–2	2–0	3–1	2–0	2–1	1–2	1–3	5–0	0–0	1–0	1–1	0–3	0–0		0–2
Portadown	3–2	1–2	6–1	3–1	2–0	2–3	4–0	0–0	0–1	2–2	5–1	0–0	1–2	2–1	5–1	

Source: Irish League Archive
Legend: Blue = home team win; Yellow = draw; Red = away team win.

== Promotion/relegation play-off ==
Institute, the club that finished in the relegation play-off place, faced Donegal Celtic, the runners-up of the 2005–06 Irish First Division in a two-legged tie for a place in next season's Irish Premier League.

5 May 2006

Donegal Celtic	3 – 1	Institute

Solitude, Belfast

10 May 2006

Institute	0 – 0	Donegal Celtic

Riverside Stadium, Drumahoe

Donegal Celtic won 3–1 on aggregate and were promoted, Institute were relegated.
