= 2005 Setanta Cup =

Tournament details
- Country: Northern Ireland; Republic of Ireland
- Teams: 6

Final positions
- Champions: Linfield (1st title)
- Runners-up: Shelbourne

Tournament statistics
- Matches played: 13
- Goals scored: 33 (2.54 per match)

The 2005 Setanta Cup was the first edition of the Setanta Sports Cup, a club football competition featuring teams from both football associations on the island of Ireland. It was inaugurated as a cross-border competition between clubs from the League of Ireland in the Republic of Ireland and the Irish League in Northern Ireland.

The cup is sponsored by Setanta Sports; the Irish sports television network. The competition was launched with Setanta providing support for prize money (€350,000) and sponsorship (€1.6 million over 4 years).

For this season the cup was simply known as the Setanta Cup before being renamed the Setanta Sports Cup from 2006 onwards.

Glentoran beat Longford Town 2–1 in the first ever game of the competition on 15 March 2005. The first final saw Belfast side Linfield defeat Dublin's Shelbourne 2–0 at Tolka Park in Dublin on 21 May 2005 to collect the winner's prize of €150,000.

== Format ==
The teams would be split into two groups of 3 teams and play each other twice, once at home and once away. The winners of each group would play in a single game final, to be held in Tolka Park if at least one team from the Republic of Ireland was involved. If the final was played between two teams from Northern Ireland, the final would be held at Windsor Park.

== Qualification ==
=== League of Ireland ===
Shelbourne qualified by winning the 2004 League of Ireland Premier Division title. Longford Town qualified by winning the 2004 FAI Cup Final. Cork City took the third spot by finishing second in the 2004 League of Ireland Premier Division.

=== Irish League ===
Linfield qualified by winning the 2003–04 Irish Premier League. Glentoran qualified by winning the 2003–04 Irish Cup. The third spot went to Portadown for finishing second in the 2003–04 Irish Premier League.

Following a draw (in which league winners were kept apart), the teams were placed as follows;

- Group 1; Linfield, Longford Town, Glentoran
- Group 2; Shelbourne, Portadown, Cork City

== Group stage ==
=== Group 1 ===
Pos	Team	Pld	W	D	L	GF	GA	GD	Pts	Qualification
1	(Northern Ireland) Linfield (A)	4	3	0	1	9	6	+3	9	Advanced to final
2	(Republic of Ireland) Longford Town	4	2	0	2	4	4	0	6	
3	(Northern Ireland) Glentoran	4	1	0	3	6	9	−3	3	

(A) Advance to a further round
2005-03-15

Glentoran	2 – 1	Longford Town
Halliday 48'; Parkhouse 65'	(Report)	Keegan 83'

The Oval, Belfast

2005-04-04

Longford Town	2 – 1	Linfield
Paisley 6'; Myler 45'	(Report)	McAreavey 86'

Flancare Park, Longford

2005-04-19

Linfield	3 – 2	Glentoran
Larmour 11'; King 35'; Simpson o.g. 58'	(Report)	Halliday 47'; Melaugh 85'

Windsor Park, Belfast

2005-04-25

Longford Town	1 – 0	Glentoran
Paisley 88'; Paisley (red card) 89'	(Report)

Flancare Park, Longford

2005-05-10

Linfield	1 – 0	Longford Town
Thompson 26'; McCann (red card) 82'	(Report)

Windsor Park, Belfast

2005-05-16

Glentoran	2 – 4	Linfield
Lockhart 62'; Holmes 72'	(Report)	McAreavey 5'; Murphy 28'; Ferguson 43'; Mouncey 54'

The Oval, Belfast
Referee: (Republic of Ireland) Ian Stokes

=== Group 2 ===
Pos	Team	Pld	W	D	L	GF	GA	GD	Pts	Qualification
1	(Republic of Ireland) Shelbourne (A)	4	2	1	1	5	4	+1	7	Advanced to final
2	(Northern Ireland) Portadown	4	1	2	1	5	5	0	5	
3	(Republic of Ireland) Cork City	4	1	1	2	2	3	−1	4	

(A) Advance to a further round
2005-03-22

Shelbourne	3 – 3	Portadown
Baker 40', 67'; Byrne 44'	(Report)	Hamilton 49', 59'; Boyle 83'

Tolka Park, Dublin

2005-03-28

Cork City	1 – 0	Shelbourne
Behan 59'; Gamble (red card) 85'	(Report)	Crawley (red card) 90'

Turners Cross, Cork
Attendance: 4,000
Referee: (Northern Ireland) David Malcolm

2005-04-11

Portadown	1 – 1	Cork City
Kelly 77'	(Report)	Doyle 64'

Shamrock Park, Portadown

2005-04-25

Portadown	0 – 1	Shelbourne
Feeney (red card) 53'	(Report)	Byrne 4'

Shamrock Park, Portadown

2005-05-02

Shelbourne	1 – 0	Cork City
Harris 52'	(Report)

Tolka Park, Dublin
Referee: (Northern Ireland) Mark Courtney

2005-05-16

Cork City	0 – 1	Portadown
McNulty (red card)	(Report)	Hamilton 30'; Hamilton (red card)

Turners Cross, Cork
Referee: (Republic of Ireland) John Feighery

== Final ==
2005-05-21

Shelbourne	0 – 2	Linfield
Byrne (red card) 90+'; Moore (red card) 90+'	(Report)	Ferguson 26'; Thompson 37'

Tolka Park, Dublin
Referee: (Northern Ireland) Mark Courtney

Winner of 2005 Setanta Sports Cup

1st title

== Goalscorers ==
3 goals

- (Northern Ireland) Gary Hamilton (Portadown)

2 goals

- (Republic of Ireland) Richie Baker (Shelbourne)
- (Republic of Ireland) Jason Byrne (Shelbourne)
- (Northern Ireland) Glenn Ferguson (Linfield)
- (Northern Ireland) Michael Halliday (Glentoran)
- (Northern Ireland) Paul McAreavey (Linfield)
- (Republic of Ireland) Stephen Paisley (Longford Town)
- (Northern Ireland) Peter Thompson (Linfield)

1 goal

- (Republic of Ireland) Denis Behan (Cork City)
- (Northern Ireland) Wesley Boyle (Portadown)
- (Republic of Ireland) Kevin Doyle (Cork City)
- (Wales) Jamie Harris (Shelbourne)
- (Northern Ireland) Shaun Holmes (Glentoran)
- (Republic of Ireland) Paul Keegan (Longford Town)
- (Northern Ireland) Darren Kelly (Portadown)
- (Northern Ireland) Stuart King (Linfield)
- (Northern Ireland) Davy Larmour (Linfield)
- (Northern Ireland) Darren Lockhart (Glentoran)
- (Northern Ireland) Gavin Melaugh (Glentoran)
- (Northern Ireland) Tim Mouncey (Linfield)
- (Northern Ireland) William Murphy (Linfield)
- (Republic of Ireland) Andy Myler (Longford Town)
- (Northern Ireland) Stephen Parkhouse (Glentoran)

1 own goal

- (Northern Ireland) Philip Simpson (Glentoran)
