= 2007–08 Irish Premier League =

Irish Premier League
- Season: 2007–08
- Champions: Linfield; 48th Irish title
- Relegated: Armagh City; Donegal Celtic; Larne; Limavady United; Portadown
- UEFA Champions League: Linfield
- UEFA Cup: Cliftonville; Glentoran
- UEFA Intertoto Cup: Lisburn Distillery
- Matches: 240
- Goals: 698 (2.91 per match)
- Top goalscorer: Peter Thompson (29 goals)
- Biggest home win: Glenavon 5–0 Armagh City; Linfield 5–0 Crusaders; Linfield 5–0 Newry City; Lisburn Distillery 5–0 Limavady United
- Biggest away win: Armagh City 0–5 Glentoran
- Highest scoring: Dungannon Swifts 4–6 Newry City

Location of teams in the 2007–08 Irish Premier League
Location of the Belfast-based teams in the 2007–08 Irish Premier League

The 2007–08 Irish Premier League was the 107th edition of the Irish League, the highest level of league competition in Northern Irish football, and the 5th and final edition in its current format (as the Irish Premier League) since its inception in 2003.

Linfield won the league for the 48th time and 3rd consecutive season.

== Summary ==
This was the last season of the competition before the league system in Northern Ireland was restructured. The 2008–09 competition onwards would be re-branded as the IFA Premiership, with stricter rules governing the eligibility of clubs wishing to take part. The top tier of the Northern Irish league system would also be reduced in size from sixteen clubs, to twelve.

The season began on 22 September 2007, and ended on 26 April 2008. Linfield were the defending champions, and successfully defended their title, winning their 48th title by 3 points. Five teams were relegated to the newly introduced IFA Championship for the following season.

== League table ==
Pos	Team	Pld	W	D	L	GF	GA	GD	Pts	Qualification or relegation
1	Linfield (C)	30	23	5	2	71	18	+53	74	Qualification to Champions League first qualifying round
2	Glentoran	30	22	5	3	69	24	+45	71	Qualification to UEFA Cup first qualifying round
3	Cliftonville	30	18	6	6	55	32	+23	60	Qualification to UEFA Cup first qualifying round
4	Lisburn Distillery	30	17	7	6	50	28	+22	58	Qualification to Intertoto Cup first round
5	Portadown	30	15	2	13	44	39	+5	47	Outside relegation zone, but failed to qualify for IFA Premiership
6	Ballymena United	30	12	8	10	42	41	+1	44	
7	Crusaders	30	12	7	11	45	47	−2	43	
8	Newry City	30	13	4	13	45	52	−7	43	
9	Coleraine	30	11	7	12	41	50	−9	40	
10	Dungannon Swifts	30	9	9	12	38	44	−6	36	
11	Donegal Celtic	30	9	8	13	39	47	−8	35	Outside relegation zone, but failed to qualify for IFA Premiership
12	Glenavon	30	9	3	18	37	51	−14	30	
13	Larne	30	7	4	19	44	71	−27	25	Outside relegation zone, but failed to qualify for IFA Premiership
14	Institute	30	5	8	17	23	41	−18	23	
15	Limavady United (R)	30	6	5	19	26	57	−31	23	Relegation to IFA Championship
16	Armagh City (R)	30	5	6	19	29	56	−27	21	Relegation to IFA Championship

Source: rsssf.com
Rules for classification: 1) points; 2) goal difference; 3) number of goals scored.
(C) Champions; (R) Relegated

== Results ==
Each team played every other team twice (home and away) for a total of 30 games.

Home \ Away	ARM	BYM	CLI	COL	CRU	DGC	DUN	GLA	GLT	INS	LRN	LIM	LIN	LIS	NEW	POR
Armagh City		1–2	0–1	0–1	2–2	1–1	0–1	2–0	0–5	1–1	2–5	1–0	1–3	4–1	1–2	1–1
Ballymena United	2–1		0–1	2–0	2–2	0–0	0–0	0–0	0–4	2–1	3–0	3–0	0–4	2–2	2–1	2–1
Cliftonville	2–1	3–2		1–2	0–1	5–1	2–1	3–3	4–2	2–0	1–1	4–1	2–2	2–2	2–0	2–1
Coleraine	2–0	1–1	0–3		3–3	3–2	2–2	0–1	1–4	2–1	4–1	1–0	1–4	1–4	0–1	1–1
Crusaders	1–1	3–0	1–1	3–4		2–0	1–0	2–1	0–2	1–0	4–1	2–1	0–3	1–3	4–1	0–2
Donegal Celtic	3–0	0–2	0–2	1–1	3–0		3–1	2–0	3–3	0–1	4–3	3–1	1–1	1–2	2–3	0–1
Dungannon Swifts	5–1	2–1	1–0	4–1	1–1	0–0		1–4	0–0	0–1	1–0	0–2	4–0	0–3	4–6	0–3
Glenavon	5–0	1–2	1–2	1–0	0–4	0–1	1–2		1–2	2–0	2–3	0–3	0–2	2–3	1–0	0–3
Glentoran	1–0	2–4	2–1	2–1	3–0	5–1	1–1	3–0		4–0	1–0	3–0	1–0	2–2	2–1	3–1
Institute	1–1	1–1	1–2	0–0	3–1	1–1	1–0	2–3	1–2		0–1	0–0	0–1	0–2	0–2	1–2
Larne	0–2	2–1	1–2	1–2	0–3	4–2	3–3	3–4	0–3	1–2		2–2	1–5	1–2	3–0	1–2
Limavady United	0–3	3–1	3–1	0–0	1–2	0–1	1–1	1–0	1–0	2–2	2–3		0–4	1–2	1–3	0–2
Linfield	2–1	1–0	0–0	4–0	5–0	2–0	2–1	3–2	0–0	1–0	3–0	3–0		2–1	5–0	1–0
Lisburn Distillery	1–0	0–2	1–2	2–0	1–0	0–1	1–1	0–0	1–2	0–0	2–0	5–0	0–0		1–0	1–0
Newry City	3–0	2–2	1–0	0–2	1–1	1–1	3–0	2–1	0–3	2–1	2–2	3–0	0–3	1–4		2–1
Portadown	2–1	2–1	0–2	1–5	2–0	2–1	0–1	0–1	0–2	2–1	5–1	2–0	2–5	0–1	3–2	

Source: rsssf.com
Legend: Blue = home team win; Yellow = draw; Red = away team win.

== League restructuring ==
From the 2008–09 season onwards, the league system in Northern Ireland was re-structured. It would be renamed as the IFA Premiership, and reduced to twelve teams, included on the basis not only of their performance in the 2007–08 season, but in the previous two seasons, and other off-the-field criteria as follows. Each applicant club was assessed by an independent panel and awarded points against the following criteria:

- Sporting – based on league placings, Irish Cup, League Cup and European performances in 2005–06, 2006–07 and 2007–08; with points also awarded for running youth teams, women's teams and community development programmes.
- Finance – based on solvency, debt management and cash-flow projection.
- Infrastructure – based on stadium capacity, changing provisions, sanitary facilities, field of play, floodlighting, existence and standard of control room, first aid room, drug testing room and media facilities.
- Personnel – based on qualification and experience of staff
- Business planning
- Attendances

Five of this season's sixteen Premier League teams failed to gain a place in the new twelve-team Premiership and were relegated to the newly introduced IFA Championship. Of the five teams that missed out, two of them - Armagh City and Limavady United failed to obtain the necessary domestic licence, while Larne did not apply. Donegal Celtic obtained a licence, but were ranked thirteenth in the entry list, and thus missed out by one place. Finally, Portadown also obtained a licence, but were relegated to the IFA Championship as a result of submitting their application for the IFA Premiership 29 minutes past the deadline for consideration. That left thirteen clubs to be ranked - twelve from this season's Premier League plus Bangor, who had finished fourth in the First Division.

=== Rankings ===
Rank	Club	Points	Division	Notes
1	Linfield	1339	2008–09 IFA Premiership	
2	Ballymena United	1054	2008–09 IFA Premiership	
3	Glentoran	1016	2008–09 IFA Premiership	
4	Coleraine	965	2008–09 IFA Premiership	
5	Cliftonville	945	2008–09 IFA Premiership	
6	Dungannon Swifts	855	2008–09 IFA Premiership	
7	Glenavon	828	2008–09 IFA Premiership	
8	Crusaders	826	2008–09 IFA Premiership	
9	Lisburn Distillery	815	2008–09 IFA Premiership	
10	Newry City	796	2008–09 IFA Premiership	
11	Bangor	641	2008–09 IFA Premiership	Only club from outside this season's Premier League to apply.
12	Institute	632	2008–09 IFA Premiership	
13	Donegal Celtic	543	2008–09 IFA Championship	Missed out on the Premiership by one place.
–	Portadown	–	2008–09 IFA Championship	Gained Domestic Licence, but Premiership application received past deadline.
–	Armagh City	–	2008–09 IFA Championship	Applied, but failed to gain Domestic Licence.
–	Limavady United	–	2008–09 IFA Championship	Applied, but failed to gain Domestic Licence.
–	Larne	–	2008–09 IFA Championship	Did not apply.

Source: BBC Sport
