= 2006–07 Irish Premier League =

Irish Premier League
- Season: 2006–07
- Champions: Linfield; 47th Irish title
- Relegated: Loughgall
- UEFA Champions League: Linfield
- UEFA Cup: Dungannon Swifts; Glentoran
- UEFA Intertoto Cup: Cliftonville
- Matches: 240
- Goals: 736 (3.07 per match)
- Top goalscorer: Gary Hamilton (27 goals)

Location of teams in the 2006–07 Irish Premier League
Location of the Belfast-based teams in the 2006–07 Irish Premier League

The 2006–07 Irish Premier League was the 106th edition of the Irish League, the highest level of league competition in Northern Irish football, and the 4th edition in its current format (as the Irish Premier League) since its inception in 2003.

Linfield won the league for the 47th time and 2nd consecutive season.

== Summary ==
The season began on 23 September 2006, and ended on 28 April 2007. Linfield was the defending champion, and successfully defended the title by 8 points to become champions for the 47th time. Loughgall was relegated after finishing bottom of the table, while Glenavon survived after beating Bangor 4–2 on penalties in the promotion play-off following a 1–1 draw on aggregate after extra time in the second leg.

== League table ==
Pos	Team	Pld	W	D	L	GF	GA	GD	Pts	Qualification or relegation
1	Linfield (C)	30	21	8	1	73	19	+54	71	Qualification to Champions League first qualifying round
2	Glentoran	30	20	3	7	76	33	+43	63	Qualification to UEFA Cup first qualifying round
3	Cliftonville	30	18	7	5	47	26	+21	61	Qualification to Intertoto Cup first round
4	Portadown	30	17	7	6	49	26	+23	58	
5	Lisburn Distillery	30	14	6	10	50	39	+11	48	
6	Crusaders	30	14	5	11	50	42	+8	47	
7	Coleraine	30	13	6	11	55	50	+5	45	
8	Dungannon Swifts	30	13	5	12	41	41	0	44	Qualification to UEFA Cup first qualifying round (Note: Since 2006–07 Irish Cup winners Linfield had qualified for the Champions League, Dungannon Swifts qualified for the 2007–08 UEFA Cup as Irish Cup runners-up.)
9	Ballymena United	30	12	7	11	46	40	+6	43	
10	Limavady United	30	10	5	15	39	54	−15	35	
11	Armagh City	30	11	2	17	42	68	−26	35	
12	Newry City	30	8	7	15	39	52	−13	31	
13	Donegal Celtic	30	6	9	15	33	51	−18	27	
14	Larne	30	7	5	18	33	60	−27	26	
15	Glenavon (O)	30	5	10	15	40	58	−18	25	Qualification to Promotion/relegation play-off
16	Loughgall (R)	30	1	8	21	23	77	−54	11	Relegation to Irish First Division

Source: rsssf.com
Rules for classification: 1) points; 2) goal difference; 3) number of goals scored.
(C) Champions; (O) Play-off winners; (R) Relegated

== Results ==
Each team played every other team twice (home and away) for a total of 30 games.

Home \ Away	ARM	BYM	CLI	COL	CRU	DGC	DUN	GLA	GLT	LRN	LIM	LIN	LIS	LOU	NEW	POR
Armagh City		0–3	1–3	4–3	1–3	1–0	0–1	1–2	0–3	2–1	4–2	0–2	1–2	1–0	1–3	2–3
Ballymena United	2–2		0–1	2–3	2–1	1–0	2–1	4–2	3–2	3–0	0–0	0–0	0–1	4–1	1–1	2–0
Cliftonville	1–0	2–1		2–1	4–2	0–0	1–0	0–0	1–2	0–0	0–1	0–0	3–1	2–0	2–1	0–0
Coleraine	2–0	0–1	2–1		1–3	3–1	2–1	1–3	1–2	4–3	2–4	2–2	2–1	4–2	2–1	1–1
Crusaders	6–2	2–2	1–2	0–3		4–1	2–1	1–1	1–3	3–1	0–3	2–3	1–1	2–1	1–0	0–3
Donegal Celtic	1–2	3–2	0–1	1–3	0–2		0–0	2–3	1–0	3–0	2–1	0–1	2–1	1–1	1–1	2–4
Dungannon Swifts	4–2	1–0	3–2	1–1	1–2	1–2		1–1	2–4	2–1	2–1	1–5	2–3	3–1	3–2	0–1
Glenavon	2–3	3–1	0–1	3–3	0–1	3–3	1–2		0–3	1–1	0–1	2–4	1–1	2–0	1–2	1–4
Glentoran	8–0	2–0	4–1	3–2	1–0	1–1	0–1	2–2		6–3	3–0	1–2	3–1	4–0	2–0	2–3
Larne	0–1	0–1	1–3	0–1	0–0	2–1	1–0	3–0	0–4		2–3	0–0	1–5	3–0	0–4	0–1
Limavady United	0–3	1–1	1–1	2–1	0–1	1–1	0–1	3–2	1–2	2–1		0–4	0–5	4–1	2–3	1–2
Linfield	5–3	2–0	0–3	2–1	1–0	3–0	0–0	0–0	1–1	5–0	3–2		3–0	7–0	2–0	0–0
Lisburn Distillery	0–1	3–1	0–4	2–0	1–1	4–1	1–0	4–0	3–1	1–3	0–1	0–4		3–0	1–1	2–0
Loughgall	1–1	3–3	1–2	1–3	0–5	2–2	1–1	1–1	1–3	1–2	1–1	0–6	1–2		1–1	0–3
Newry City	2–3	1–3	1–2	1–1	2–1	1–1	2–3	3–2	0–4	2–3	3–1	0–4	0–0	1–0		0–2
Portadown	3–0	2–1	2–2	0–0	1–2	2–0	0–2	2–1	2–0	1–1	3–0	1–2	1–1	0–1	2–0	

Source: Irish League Archive
Legend: Blue = home team win; Yellow = draw; Red = away team win.

== Promotion/relegation play-off ==
Glenavon, the club that finished in the relegation play-off place, faced Bangor, the runners-up of the 2006–07 Irish First Division in a two-legged tie for a place in next season's Irish Premier League.

Glenavon won the tie 4–2 on penalties after a 1-1 aggregate draw and retained their Premiership status.

11 May 2007

Bangor	0 – 1	Glenavon

Clandeboye Park, Bangor

15 May 2007

Glenavon	0 – 1 (a.e.t.)	Bangor
Penalties
	4-2

Mourneview Park, Lurgan

1-1 on aggregate. Glenavon won 4–2 on penalties and remained in the Irish Premier League
