= 2008–09 IFA Interim Intermediate League =

IFA Interim Intermediate League
- Season: 2008–09
- Champions: Harland & Wolff Welders
- Relegated: Brantwood; Oxford United Stars
- Matches played: 132
- Goals scored: 413 (3.13 per match)

The 2008–09 IFA Interim Intermediate League was a temporary third-tier football league in Northern Ireland for one season only, consisting of the former members of the IFA Intermediate League (dissolved in 2008) who did not meet the criteria for the new IFA Championship. Members of the Interim League had one year to make improvements in order to gain entry to the 2009–10 IFA Championship.

The title was won by Harland & Wolff Welders.

With the Championship expanding to two divisions the following season; Championship 1 and Championship 2, ten of the twelve members of the league succeeded in gaining entry to the 2009–10 IFA Championship 2, with only Oxford United Stars and Brantwood failing to do so, dropping out of national football.

== League table ==
Pos	Team	Pld	W	D	L	GF	GA	GD	Pts	Qualification or relegation
1	Harland & Wolff Welders (C)	22	19	2	1	55	18	+37	59	Gained entry to 2009–10 IFA Championship 2
2	Dundela	22	18	2	2	70	19	+51	56	Gained entry to 2009–10 IFA Championship 2
3	PSNI	22	12	4	6	38	27	+11	40	Gained entry to 2009–10 IFA Championship 2
4	Queens University	22	10	5	7	36	24	+12	35	Gained entry to 2009–10 IFA Championship 2
5	Lurgan Celtic	22	11	2	9	44	36	+8	35	Gained entry to 2009–10 IFA Championship 2
6	Annagh United	22	9	3	10	33	30	+3	30	Gained entry to 2009–10 IFA Championship 2
7	Oxford United Stars (R)	22	9	2	11	26	31	−5	29	Failed to gain entry – moved to Level 4 regional league and retired from national football
8	Portstewart	22	7	4	11	23	38	−15	25	Gained entry to 2009–10 IFA Championship 2
9	Moyola Park	22	6	6	10	24	37	−13	24	Gained entry to 2009–10 IFA Championship 2
10	Wakehurst	22	4	5	13	22	36	−14	17	Gained entry to 2009–10 IFA Championship 2
11	Brantwood (R)	22	3	5	14	23	56	−33	14	Failed to gain entry – moved to Level 4 regional league and retired from national football
12	Chimney Corner	22	3	2	17	19	61	−42	11	Gained entry to 2009–10 IFA Championship 2

Source: rsssf.com
Rules for classification: 1st points; 2nd goal difference; 3rd goals scored; 4th head-to-head points; 5th head-to-head goal difference
(C) Champions; (R) Relegated

== IFA Interim Intermediate League Cup ==
A knockout competition for members of the Interim League - the IFA Interim Intermediate League Cup - took place during 2008-09 and was won by Harland & Wolff Welders, who beat Dundela in the final on 9 December 2008.

== See also ==
- IFA Premiership
- IFA Championship
- IFA Intermediate Cup
- Irish Cup
- Irish League Cup
- County Antrim Shield
- Steel & Sons Cup
- Mid-Ulster Cup
- Bob Radcliffe Cup
- North West Senior Cup
- Craig Memorial Cup
- Northern Ireland football league system
