= 2009–10 IFA Championship =

IFA Championship
- Season: 2009–10

The 2009–10 IFA Championship (known as the Ladbrokes.com Championship for sponsorship reasons) was the second season since its establishment after a major overhaul of the league system in Northern Ireland. It also marked the first season in which the Championship was divided into two divisions, with the clubs in both divisions having intermediate status. Championship 1 served as the second tier of Northern Irish football, with Championship 2 as the third tier.

In Championship 1, Loughgall were crowned champions on 8 May 2010 after a 2–0 win over Ards. However, they were denied promotion because they did not gain the required licence from the IFA. Therefore, runners-up Donegal Celtic entered into a two-leg play-off with the bottom club of the 2009–10 IFA Premiership, and achieved promotion with a 1–0 aggregate win. At the other end of the table, Coagh United and Armagh City finished in the bottom two, and were relegated to Championship 2 for next season.

In Championship 2, Harland & Wolff Welders won the title by 7 points, achieving promotion to Championship 1. Also promoted were Dergview who finished as runners-up. There was no relegation from Championship 2 this season.

== Team changes from 2008–09 ==
The 2008–09 Championship consisted of one division of 17 clubs. The bottom 3 clubs (Tobermore United, Killymoon Rangers and Dergview) were relegated to the newly introduced Championship 2 for this season. Championship 2 was set up to replace the IFA Interim Intermediate League, introduced as a temporary league for the 2008–09 season only, consisting of the former members of the IFA Intermediate League (dissolved in 2008) who did not meet the criteria for the new IFA Championship 2; it consisted of 12 clubs. Members of the Interim League had one year to make improvements in order to gain entry to Championship 2 for this season.

10 of the 12 clubs managed to meet the criteria, along with Sport & Leisure Swifts and Knockbreda who both achieved intermediate status, with only Brantwood and Oxford United Stars failing to do so. Harland & Wolff Welders were the champions. There was no promotion from the Interim League which meant that Championship 1 would be reduced to 14 clubs, with Championship 2 having 15.

Portadown were promoted to the 2009–10 IFA Premiership as 2008–09 Championship winners. Bangor entered Championship 1 after they announced that due to financial problems, they would not be able to renew their domestic licence required to take part in the Premiership.

== Championship 1 ==
IFA Championship 1
- Champions: Loughgall
- Promoted: Donegal Celtic
- Relegated: Armagh City; Coagh United
- Matches played: 182
- Goals scored: 561 (3.08 per match)
- Biggest home win: Ballyclare Comrades 6–1 Glebe Rangers; Larne 6–1 Coagh United; Ards 5–0 Ballyclare Comrades
- Biggest away win: Glebe Rangers 1–8 Donegal Celtic
- Highest scoring: Glebe Rangers 1–8 Donegal Celtic

Location of teams in the 2009–10 IFA Championship 1

=== League table ===
Pos	Team	Pld	W	D	L	GF	GA	GD	Pts	Qualification or relegation
1	Loughgall (Note: Loughgall were ineligible for promotion to the Premiership, as they did not attain the required licence.) (C)	26	19	3	4	60	24	+36	60	
2	Donegal Celtic (O, P)	26	19	2	5	59	21	+38	59	Qualification to promotion play-off
3	Limavady United	26	18	3	5	56	29	+27	57	
4	Ards	26	13	6	7	49	27	+22	45	
5	Carrick Rangers	26	12	5	9	37	39	−2	41	
6	Ballinamallard United	26	10	8	8	36	29	+7	38	
7	Ballymoney United	26	10	8	8	39	33	+6	38	
8	Larne	26	11	4	11	34	37	−3	37	
9	Banbridge Town	26	8	3	15	33	48	−15	27	
10	Glebe Rangers	26	7	6	13	30	56	−26	27	
11	Bangor	26	7	5	14	36	48	−12	26	
12	Ballyclare Comrades	26	7	5	14	34	46	−12	26	
13	Coagh United (R)	26	6	4	16	38	62	−24	22	Relegation to IFA Championship 2
14	Armagh City (R)	26	2	4	20	20	62	−42	10	Relegation to IFA Championship 2

Source: rsssf.com
Rules for classification: 1st points; 2nd goal difference; 3rd goals scored; 4th head-to-head points; 5th head-to-head goal difference
(C) Champions; (O) Play-off winners; (P) Promoted; (R) Relegated

=== Results ===
Each team played every other team twice (once at home, and once away) for a total of 26 games.

Home \ Away	ARD	ARM	BMD	BCC	BMY	BBT	BGR	CRK	COA	DGC	GBE	LRN	LIM	LGL
Ards		3–0	1–0	5–0	1–0	3–0	1–1	1–2	3–0	4–0	4–0	3–0	2–2	3–1
Armagh City	0–3		1–1	0–4	1–1	3–0	1–2	0–3	0–0	0–3	0–1	0–2	0–1	0–4
Ballinamallard United	1–1	4–1		0–2	0–1	0–2	4–3	4–1	0–1	0–0	2–2	2–0	2–3	0–0
Ballyclare Comrades	1–1	3–1	0–0		0–1	0–3	2–0	1–1	1–1	0–1	6–1	1–2	0–4	1–3
Ballymoney United	0–0	2–1	0–1	2–2		1–0	2–2	0–1	0–1	2–1	0–1	3–1	0–1	5–4
Banbridge Town	0–2	3–1	2–2	0–1	1–3		2–6	1–3	2–1	0–2	1–1	1–1	1–2	0–3
Bangor	0–1	3–2	0–2	2–1	1–4	2–0		2–2	4–3	0–1	1–2	1–3	0–2	0–0
Carrick Rangers	2–1	2–0	0–2	1–0	2–2	1–0	4–1		1–2	1–0	2–1	3–2	1–1	0–1
Coagh United	5–1	3–3	0–1	5–3	2–2	2–3	1–3	3–2		0–4	0–2	2–3	1–2	0–3
Donegal Celtic	3–3	3–1	4–0	1–0	3–1	2–4	2–1	4–0	2–1		4–0	3–0	1–0	3–0
Glebe Rangers	3–0	1–3	1–1	1–2	0–3	1–4	2–0	0–0	2–1	1–8		1–1	3–4	0–2
Larne	1–0	2–1	0–3	2–0	1–1	1–0	1–1	2–0	6–1	1–2	2–0		0–1	0–1
Limavady United	3–2	4–0	2–0	4–2	2–2	0–2	2–0	5–1	4–2	0–2	3–1	2–0		0–1
Loughgall	2–0	4–0	1–4	4–1	3–1	4–1	1–0	3–1	5–0	1–0	2–2	4–0	3–2	

Source: rsssf.com
Legend: Blue = home team win; Yellow = draw; Red = away team win.

== Championship 2 ==
IFA Championship 2
- Champions: Harland & Wolff Welders
- Promoted: Harland & Wolff Welders; Dergview
- Matches played: 210
- Goals scored: 700 (3.33 per match)
- Biggest home win: Dergview 11–0 Chimney Corner
- Biggest away win: Annagh United 2–7 H&W Welders; Wakehurst 2–7 Dergview; Chimney Corner 1–6 Dergview; Sport & Leisure 1–6 Queen's University; Annagh United 0–5 Portstewart
- Highest scoring: Dergview 11–0 Chimney Corner

Location of teams in the 2009–10 IFA Championship 2
Location of the Belfast-based teams in the 2009–10 IFA Championship 2

=== League table ===
Pos	Team	Pld	W	D	L	GF	GA	GD	Pts	Promotion
1	Harland & Wolff Welders (C, P)	28	23	2	3	73	30	+43	71	Promotion to IFA Championship 1
2	Dergview (P)	28	20	4	4	77	20	+57	64	Promotion to IFA Championship 1
3	Dundela	28	18	7	3	66	31	+35	61	
4	PSNI	28	15	5	8	54	40	+14	50	
5	Knockbreda	28	14	6	8	44	32	+12	48	
6	Tobermore United	28	14	4	10	47	39	+8	46	
7	Portstewart	28	11	7	10	42	38	+4	40	
8	Queen's University	28	11	4	13	43	40	+3	37	
9	Moyola Park	28	10	5	13	42	42	0	35	
10	Lurgan Celtic	28	10	4	14	37	49	−12	34	
11	Sport & Leisure Swifts	28	10	4	14	44	60	−16	34	
12	Annagh United	28	7	3	18	28	66	−38	24	
13	Killymoon Rangers	28	7	2	19	38	60	−22	23	
14	Wakehurst	28	5	4	19	33	58	−25	19	
15	Chimney Corner	28	1	7	20	32	95	−63	10	

Source: rsssf.com
Rules for classification: 1st points; 2nd goal difference; 3rd goals scored; 4th head-to-head points; 5th head-to-head goal difference
(C) Champions; (P) Promoted

=== Results ===
Each team played every other team twice (once at home, and once away) for a total of 28 games.

Home \ Away	ANN	CHI	DGV	DND	H&W	KMR	KNB	LGC	MOY	PSNI	PST	QUE	SLS	TOB	WAK
Annagh United		3–1	0–3	2–4	2–7	3–2	1–3	0–1	2–1	1–4	0–5	1–2	1–4	1–5	2–0
Chimney Corner	0–0		1–6	0–3	0–2	1–4	1–5	2–2	3–3	1–2	0–3	1–4	2–2	0–3	3–3
Dergview	3–0	11–0		0–2	1–2	2–1	0–0	1–1	0–1	3–0	5–0	1–0	4–0	4–0	3–2
Dundela	2–0	6–2	2–1		2–2	3–2	4–2	4–0	1–1	0–0	2–1	3–1	3–0	2–3	2–1
Harland & Wolff Welders	4–0	2–2	0–2	4–2		3–1	2–0	2–1	2–1	4–0	2–1	1–0	0–2	5–1	4–1
Killymoon Rangers	1–1	4–1	0–1	2–1	3–4		0–4	2–3	2–1	0–1	1–4	3–0	3–0	0–3	0–1
Knockbreda	0–1	2–0	0–4	1–1	0–3	0–0		3–1	2–1	1–2	4–2	0–1	3–1	0–0	2–1
Lurgan Celtic	3–0	0–2	3–4	1–1	0–2	3–2	0–1		0–3	1–1	4–0	1–0	2–1	0–4	2–1
Moyola Park	1–3	4–1	0–2	1–4	1–2	3–0	0–1	2–0		2–4	1–1	2–2	1–2	3–2	1–0
PSNI	3–1	6–2	2–2	0–3	1–2	3–0	3–4	0–1	1–0		2–1	2–2	1–2	1–2	2–0
Portstewart	0–0	2–1	0–1	0–2	3–1	1–2	1–0	1–2	3–0	0–0		2–1	1–1	1–1	1–1
Queen's University	1–0	6–0	0–2	1–1	1–3	2–0	1–1	1–0	1–4	1–4	0–1		2–4	2–0	3–0
Sport & Leisure Swifts	3–1	3–2	0–3	0–2	2–3	5–1	1–1	3–2	1–1	1–3	1–3	1–6		1–3	0–3
Tobermore United	3–0	2–1	1–1	2–2	0–4	2–0	0–2	2–1	0–1	0–2	2–3	2–1	2–0		0–1
Wakehurst	0–2	2–2	2–7	1–2	0–1	4–2	0–2	4–2	0–2	3–4	1–1	0–1	1–3	0–2	

Source: rsssf.com
Legend: Blue = home team win; Yellow = draw; Red = away team win.
