= Donegal Celtic Park =

Association football venue in Belfast, Northern Ireland

Coordinates: 54°34′25.29″N 6°01′25.17″W

- Interactive map of Donegal Celtic Park
- Full name: Donegal Celtic Park
- Location: Belfast, Northern Ireland
- Owner: Donegal Celtic F.C.
- Capacity: 8,283 (safe capacity 2,330)
- Surface: Grass

Construction
- Renovated: 2009

Tenant
- Donegal Celtic F.C.

Donegal Celtic Park, also known as Suffolk Road and Celtic Park or more recently the New Suffolk Road after its expansion, is the home of amateur league team Donegal Celtic. It is situated in the Suffolk Road in west Belfast. The stadium holds 8,283, but is currently restricted to 2,330 under safety legislation.

In early August 2009, work was completed on two new stands: a home stand seating 1,850 spectators and an away stand seating 800. These stands were the first phase in a plan to expand the stadium to a capacity of 5,000 seats.
