= The Showgrounds (Coleraine) =

Football stadium in Coleraine, Northern Ireland

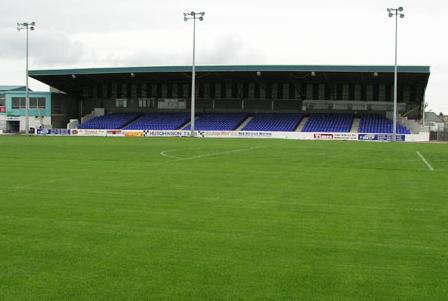
- Interactive map of The Showgrounds
- Location: Coleraine, Northern Ireland
- Coordinates: 55°7′58″N 6°39′37″W
- Capacity: 4,843
- Surface: 3G pitch

Construction
- Opened: 1907

Tenant
- Coleraine

The Showgrounds is a football stadium in Coleraine, County Londonderry, Northern Ireland. It is the home ground of Coleraine Football Club. The stadium holds 4,843 with 1,607 seats.

Between September 1971 and October 1972, Derry City were forced to use the stadium as their home-ground after the Irish Football Association banned the use of their ground in Derry, the Brandywell, due to security fears emanating from the Trouble and civil unrest in the nearby Bogside area. Derry's use ended in 1972 when, faced with dwindling crowds, travelling to Coleraine to play home-games was no longer financially sustainable.

The ground's record attendance is over 10,000, set on 15 September 1982 when Coleraine hosted Tottenham Hotspur in a pre-season friendly under newly installed floodlights. The Showgrounds is situated close to Coleraine town centre and serves as the home of NIFL Premiership football on the north coast of Northern Ireland. Coleraine F.C. have won seven Irish Cup titles while playing at The Showgrounds, the most recent coming in 2026.

== Ground ==
The Showgrounds contains several distinct areas. The Jack Doherty Grandstand provides the main covered seated area along one side of the pitch, offering clear sightlines of the full playing surface. The Railway End is an uncovered standing section popular with vocal home supporters, while the Ballycastle Road End is the traditional home end. Away supporters enter through Gate H on Hillman's Way and are accommodated in a dedicated enclosure. The ground's 3G artificial surface, installed in 2017, enables year-round use for training and competitive matches regardless of weather conditions.

== Milk Cup ==
The Showgrounds also hosts the Milk Cup finals and main matches. The Milk Cup is an international youth football tournament which features both international teams and league clubs from around the world.
