= Loughgall F.C. =

Association football club in Northern Ireland

Loughgall
- Full name: Loughgall Football Club
- Nickname: The Villagers
- Founded: 1967; 59 years ago
- Ground: Lakeview Park
- Capacity: 1,650
- Chairman: Sam Nicholson
- Manager: Darren Murphy
- League: NIFL Championship
- 2025–26: NIFL Championship, 6th of 12
- Website: https://loughgallfc.co.uk/
Home colours	Away colours

Loughgall Football Club, also referred to as simply Loughgall, or The Villagers, is a semi-professional Northern Irish football club currently playing in the NIFL Championship. Loughgall are a part of the Mid-Ulster Football Association. The club plays in the Irish Cup.

== History ==
The club, founded in 1967, is situated in the village of Loughgall, near Armagh in County Armagh and they play their home games in the village at Lakeview Park. The club was accepted into the old Irish League B Division in 1991, having played largely at junior level prior. Alfie Wylie is their longest serving manager, being in charge from 1986 to 1999. In the 1996–97 season, the club would have a good season, notably defeating Cliftonville in the League Cup, winning the Bob Radcliffe cup and reaching the semi-final of the Irish Cup. In the space of four years, the Lakeview Park side would win four consecutive B Divisions however would not be granted election to the 1st Division, being overlooked for other, arguably bigger clubs further down the league table.

=== First Premiership foray, Championship era and Premiership return (2004-) ===
They achieved senior status in 2004 on promotion to the Irish Premier League, but reverted to intermediate status upon relegation in 2007. In 2007, under the management of Niall Currie, the club had their most successful season, winning the first division, Bob Radciffe, Mid Ulster Cup, Intermediate Cup and Carnegie League Cup. The villagers would win the league again in 2009–10 but would not be promoted. On 3 March 2018, Loughgall defeated Glenavon 2–1 to reach the semi-final of the Irish Cup for the first time since 1997.

In April 2023, the club would return to the NIFL Premiership for the first time since 2007, following a 3–1 win away to Dundela. In being promoted, the village of Loughgall would become the smallest settlement, with a population of 283, to have a top flight team in Europe. The club would start their season away to Newry City. The club would perform incredibly well in the top flight, securing a notable victory over champions Larne, and finishing well clear of the relegation zone. The villagers plaudits would see manager Dean Smith receive Manager of the Year from the NIFWA. Striker Benji Magee had been subject of significant interest from Larne, Glentoran and Walsall following a strong campaign with the club, before securing a move to champions Larne in August 2024.

== Current squad ==
As of 6 February 2026

Note: Flags indicate national team as defined under FIFA eligibility rules; some limited exceptions apply. Players may hold more than one non-FIFA nationality.

No.	Pos.	Nation	Player
1	GK	NIR	Ross Glendinning
4	DF	NIR	Ben Murdock (Captain)
5	DF	NIR	Dougie Wilson
6	MF	NIR	Robbie Norton
7	MF	BRA	Pablo Andrade
9	FW	NIR	Darragh Stewart
14	DF	NIR	Harry Norton
17	FW	NIR	Daire Kelly
18	FW	NIR	Paul McElroy
25	DF	IRL	James Carroll
26	DF	IRL	Ben Harvey

No.	Pos.	Nation	Player
29	FW	NIR	Conor McCloskey
30	MF	NIR	Francis McCaffrey
31	GK	GER	Berraat Türker
32	FW	NIR	Kirk McLaughlin
33	MF	NIR	Scott McCann
34	FW	NIR	Liam Corr
35	DF	NIR	Conor Kerr
TBA	DF	NIR	Mark Carson
TBA	DF	NIR	Reece Jordan

== Managerial history ==
- Noel Willis (1967–70)
- George Willis (1970–76)
- Sam Robinson (1977–81)
- Raymond Nesbitt (1983–84)
- Willie Forbes (1984–85)
- Alfie Wylie (1986–99)
- Alan Fraser (1999)
- Ronnie Cromie (1999–01)
- Jimmy Gardiner (2001–06)
- Shane Reddish (2006–07)
- Niall Currie (2007–Feb 2011)
- Colin Malone (May 2011–Aug 2013)
- Gary McKinstry (Aug 2013–Dec 2013)
- Brian Adair (Dec 2013–Dec 2014)
- Noel Mitchell (Jan 2015–May 2015)
- Stephen Uprichard and Steven Hawe (May 2015–November 2016)
- Dean Smith (November 2016-March 2025)

== Honours ==
=== Senior honours ===
- NIFL Championship: 1
  - 2022–23
- Mid-Ulster Cup: 3
  - 2003–04, 2007–08, 2019–20

(Note: The NIFL Championship gained senior status in 2016, having previously been an intermediate competition.)

=== Intermediate honours ===
- Irish League B Division/First Division /IFA Intermediate League/IFA Championship: 7
  - 1994–95, 1995–96, 1996–97, 1997–98, 2003–04, 2007–08, 2009–10
- Irish Intermediate Cup: 2
  - 1997–98, 2007–08
- IFA Intermediate League Cup: 1
  - 2007–08
- Bob Radcliffe Cup: 12
  - 1978–79, 1996–97, 1998–99, 1999–00, 2001–02, 2002–03, 2003–04, 2007–08, 2008–09, 2009–10, 2012–13, 2014–15
