= Donegal Celtic F.C. =

Association football club in Northern Ireland

The Donegal Celtic
- Full name: Donegal Celtic Football & Social Club
- Nicknames: "DC", "The Wee Hoops", "Celtic"
- Founded: 1970
- Ground: Donegal Celtic Park; Belfast
- Capacity: 1,200
- Manager: Stephen McAlorum
- League: Ballymena & Provincial Football League
Home colours	Away colours

Donegal Celtic Football & Social Club is an intermediate football and social club based in Belfast, Northern Ireland who currently play in the Ballymena & Provincial Football League. The club, founded in 1970, plays its home matches at Donegal Celtic Park. Club colours are green and white in Celtic-style hoops.

== History ==
Donegal Celtic was formed in 1970 when a group of young men who had a huge interest in football decided to form a team in the Lenadoon district of west Belfast.

With no facilities, kits, pitch or equipment, the first few years were spent playing friendlies and entering local summer competitions, which helped to enhance and promote their reputation and name. They registered their chosen name with the Irish Football League, taking the name from the area in which they were based; Lenadoon, Gweedore, Glenveagh are all local areas named after towns in County Donegal, with the Celtic part being taken on due to the massive local following for Scotland's Celtic and, until 1949, Belfast Celtic.

The club has a youth setup, covering boys' age groups U10 – U18, and a girl's set-up at U14. Donegal Celtic Ladies senior side won the 'Belfast Cup' in 2004.

The club's senior men's team has a chequered and colourful history. After continually applying for Irish League entry they were denied on several occasions and forced to play amateur football, along with County Armagh team Lurgan Celtic. A 1990 cup tie at Linfield involved ground unrest. With accusations of a sectarian selection process and with the threat of court action looming, both clubs finally gained entry into the Irish League 2nd Division for the 2002–03 season.

The club managed to finish in 6th place in their first year in the Irish League proper, which due to a league shake-up was enough to earn promotion to the First Division. The club's second season in Irish League football was marred by poor home form and an inability to cope with the change in standard, finishing in 8th place.

Donegal Celtic finished the 2004–05 season in 3rd place losing out on a promotion play-off place to Lurgan club Glenavon and also lost the IFA Intermediate Cup final on penalties to the same team at Stangmore Park, Dungannon. The club's fortunes improved following the establishment of a management structure of Paddy Kelly, Marty McKiernan and Gerard Loughran. In the 2005–06 season, the club finished as runners-up to Crusaders in the league, earning the right to play over two legs for a place in the Premier League, which they achieved on 10 May 2006 with a 3–1 aggregate victory against Institute. The team also managed to capture the Intermediate Cup, defeating Coagh United 2–0 in the final.

The next few seasons would see the club going through managerial turmoil, changing managers seven times in four years. Paddy Kelly resigned as manager before the 2009–10 season started, with former Cliftonville and Coleraine player Pat McAllister replacing him. In June 2010, a few weeks after guiding the club's return into the top flight for the 2010–11 IFA Premiership season with a 1–0 aggregate win over Institute in the promotion play-off, McAllister agreed a new deal to stay as manager for the 2010–11 season. However, less than a month later he shocked the club by resigning, citing personal reasons for his decision.

Marty Tabb, a former Cliftonville captain and manager, took over for the start of the 2010–11 season. However, in September 2010, he was sacked after only 74 days in charge. Paddy Kelly then returned to the club for a second spell as manager. He resigned for the second time in January 2012, along with a number of coaches and the entire club committee, due to an internal club dispute.

Former Carrick Rangers boss Stephen Small was appointed Kelly's successor a few days later. However, Small's tenure would not be a successful one. The club suffered a run of 15 league games without a win, which included 12 defeats and 3 draws. They were also knocked out of the 2012–13 Irish League Cup at home, by IFA Championship 1 outfit Harland & Wolff Welders. Small resigned in September 2012, citing poor results and personal pressures as the reasons for his departure. Reserve team manager Declan McGreevy, a former Ards and Ballymena United player, was appointed as the club's next manager on 11 October 2012. Ten days later however, McGreevy was forced to stand down from the post as he did not possess the required UEFA 'A' licence to manage an IFA Premiership club. Former manager Pat McAllister was immediately announced as McGreevy's replacement, returning to the club for a second spell as manager. The club was also involved in some controversy that season, when they were deducted 3 points and fined £500 for fielding a suspended player in a 2–1 win over Lisburn Distillery – the result was changed to a 3–0 loss. The club maintained that the IFA had given them verbal clearance for the player to take part in the match, but did not appeal the decision.

The club ended the season in the relegation play-off place (11th), and faced the runners-up of Championship 1, Warrenpoint Town, for a place in next season's Premiership. The tie ended 2–2 on aggregate with Warrenpoint Town winning on the away goals rule. This relegated Donegal Celtic to the second tier. In August 2013, five days prior to the start of the 2013–14 NIFL Championship season – the club's first season return in the second tier, manager Pat McAllister along with his entire backroom staff and several first team players all quit the club following a club meeting. McAllister stated that he could no longer work under the conditions and restrictions that were imposed during the meeting as a result of the club's difficult financial situation. Former Donegal Celtic player Paul McAreavey was announced as the club's new manager a few days later. McAreavey left after one season, in which the club finished 11th, to be replaced by Nicky Maye, a member of the coaching staff.

Under Maye the team continued to struggle, finishing one point above relegation for the 2014–15 season. Maye continued as manager for the following season, but after a poor start and with the club bottom of the table without a single league win, Maye's departure was announced in October 2015. Gerry Bradley, a member of the coaching staff and former player for the club, was confirmed as his successor soon afterwards. However Bradley resigned soon after his appointment. Former Chimney Corner F.C. manager Stephen Hatfield was appointed his successor in late December 2015. However, the team continued to struggle in the second tier, with Celtic's relegation to the third tier confirmed in March 2016 after only 19 games of the 2015–16 season played. At the time their relegation was confirmed, the team had amassed a meagre 3 points and had failed to win a single league game all season, leaving them 23 points away from safety with only 7 games and 21 points left to play for.

For the 2016–17 season, the club competed in the third tier, for the first time since the 2002–03 season, finishing third.

Subsequent relegation in 2018 found the club in the fourth tier, where it continues to play.

== Current squad ==
Note: Flags indicate national team as defined under FIFA eligibility rules; some limited exceptions apply. Players may hold more than one non-FIFA nationality.

No.	Pos.	Nation	Player
—	GK	NIR	Sean McIlhone
—	GK	NIR	Niall Murphy
—	DF	NIR	Patrick McShane
—	DF	NIR	Paul Bradley
—	DF	NIR	Andrew Cleary
—	DF	NIR	Conal Burnett
—	MF	NIR	Kieran O'Connor
—	MF	NIR	Johnny Gowdy
—	MF	NIR	Conal Burns
—	MF	NIR	Tomas McCann
—	MF	NIR	Kevin Duff
—	MF	NIR	Marty Cunningham
—	MF	NIR	Niall Atkinson
—	MF	NIR	Patrick McCaffrey
—	MF	NIR	Pearse Devine
—	MF	NIR	Patrick McIlkenny
—	FW	NIR	Karl Rossbourogh

No.	Pos.	Nation	Player
—	FW	NIR	Anthony Philpott
—	MF	NIR	Eamon Hughes
—	MF	NIR	James Haughey
—	MF	NIR	Ciaran Carson
—	MF	NIR	Joe McIntyre
—	FW	NIR	Stephen O'Neill
—	FW	NIR	Mark Dickson
—	FW	NIR	Paul Carville
—	FW	NIR	Daniel Lyons
—	FW	NIR	Liam Conlon
—	FW	NIR	Conor Glenholmes
—	FW	NIR	Christopher Fay
—	FW	NIR	Anthony Lagan
—	FW	NIR	Kevin Lynch
—	FW	NIR	Sean Cahill
—	FW	NIR	Kevin Hughes

== Managerial history ==
- Pat McAllister (May 2009 – June 2010)
- Marty Tabb (June 2010 – September 2010)
- Paddy Kelly (September 2010 – January 2012)
- Stephen Small (January 2012 – September 2012)
- Declan McGreevy (October 2012)
- Pat McAllister October 2012 – August 2013)
- Paul McAreavey (August 2013 – June 2014)
- Nicky Maye (June 2014 – October 2015)
- Gerry Bradley (November 2015 – December 2015)
- Stephen Hatfield (December 2015 – March 2018)
- Brendan Shannon (March 2018 - July 2018)

== Honours ==
=== Intermediate honours ===
- Irish Intermediate Cup: 2
  - 2005–06, 2009–10
- Steel & Sons Cup: 1
  - 2003–04
- Northern Ireland Intermediate League: 8
  - 1989–90, 1990–91, 1992–93, 1993–94, 1994–95, 1998–99, 1999–00; 2001–02
- Northern Ireland Intermediate League Challenge Cup: 6
  - 1988–89, 1989–90, 1992–93, 1994–95, 1998–99, 2001–02
- Northern Ireland Intermediate League Cup: 7
  - 1988–89, 1989–90, 1991–92, 1997–98, 1998–99, 1999–00, 2001–02
- IFA Reserve League: 1
  - 2007–08†
- † Won by Donegal Celtic Reserves
