= 2015–16 Northern Ireland Football League Cup =

JBE League Cup

Tournament details
- Country: Northern Ireland
- Teams: 40

Final positions
- Champions: Cliftonville (5th win)
- Runners-up: Ards

Tournament statistics
- Matches played: 39
- Goals scored: 142 (3.64 per match)

The 2015–16 Northern Ireland Football League Cup (known as the JBE League Cup for sponsorship purposes) was the 30th edition of Northern Ireland's football knockout cup competition for national league clubs, and the third edition of the competition as the Northern Ireland Football League Cup. This season's League Cup was sponsored by JBE Mechanical Electrical, and was contested by the 40 clubs in the NIFL Premiership, NIFL Championship 1 and NIFL Championship 2. The number of participants fell by one this season following Ballymoney United's relegation from the 2014–15 NIFL Championship 2 to regional football. The competition began on 18 August 2015 with the first round, and concluded on 13 February 2016 with the final at Solitude.

For the third consecutive season Cliftonville were the defending champions, following their 3–2 win over Ballymena United in the 2015 final. This secured the trophy for the third consecutive season and the fourth time overall. This season they once again pulled off a successful defence of the Cup, defeating second-tier side Ards 3–0 in the final. In doing so, they became the first club ever to appear in, and win four consecutive League Cup finals. Ards reached the final for the first time in 21 years, and the third time overall. This marked only the second occasion in the competition's history that a club from outside the top flight had reached the final, the first being Portadown (then of the second tier) in the 2009 final. Ards' previous final appearance had also been against Cliftonville, when they won the Cup 2–0 on penalties after a 0–0 draw in 1994–95.

== Format and schedule ==
The competition was played in a straight knockout format and was open to the 40 members of the NIFL Premiership, NIFL Championship 1 and NIFL Championship 2. The top 16 ranked clubs from last season received byes into the second round, which included the 12 members of the 2014–15 NIFL Premiership and the top four ranked clubs from the 2014–15 NIFL Championship. Of the remaining 24 Championship clubs, 16 of them entered the competition in the first round, with the other eight given byes into the second round. Replays were not used in the competition, with all matches using extra time and penalties to determine the winner if necessary.

Round	Draw date	First match date	Fixtures	Clubs
First round	6 August 2015	18 August 2015	8	40 → 32
Second round	22 August 2015	1 September 2015	16	32 → 16
Third round	5 September 2015	14 October 2015	8	16 → 8
Quarter-finals	17 October 2015	18 November 2015	4	8 → 4
Semi-finals	21 November 2015	15 December 2015	2	4 → 2
Final	N/A	13 February 2016	1	2 → 1

== Results ==
The league tier of each club at the time of entering the competition is listed in parentheses.

=== First round ===
The draw for the first round was made randomly and included 24 of the 28 NIFL Championship clubs, with the top four ranked clubs from the 2014–15 NIFL Championship not entering until the second round. 8 of the 24 Championship clubs received a bye into the second round, leaving the remaining 16 Championship clubs in the first round to play a total of eight ties. The draw took place on 6 August 2015, with the matches played on 18 August 2015. The eight clubs to receive byes were: Annagh United, Dergview, Dollingstown, Dundela, Limavady United, Lisburn Distillery, Lurgan Celtic and PSNI.

Team 1	Score	Team 2
Ballyclare Comrades (2)	2–1	Wakehurst (3)
Banbridge Town (3)	3–1	Armagh City (2)
Glebe Rangers (3)	1–0	Coagh United (3)
Larne (2)	3–1	Loughgall (2)
Moyola Park (3)	2–0	Donegal Celtic (2)
Portstewart (3)	0–3	Knockbreda (2)
Queen's University (3)	1–7	Sport & Leisure Swifts (3)
Tobermore United (3)	0–2	Newington YC (3)

=== Second round ===
The second round draw was made on 22 August 2015, with the matches played on 1, 2 and 15 September 2015. The second round draw was made up of the remaining 32 clubs, with a seeding system in place for this round only. The 16 highest-ranked clubs from the 2014–15 league season were seeded, including the 12 members of the 2014–15 NIFL Premiership along with the top four clubs from the 2014–15 NIFL Championship. The eight winners from the first round matches and the eight clubs that received byes into the second round were unseeded.

Team 1	Score	Team 2
1 September 2015
Ballinamallard United (1)	5–0	Banbridge Town (3)
Carrick Rangers (1)	1–1 (aet) (5–4p)	Lurgan Celtic (2)
Coleraine (1)	3–1	Ballyclare Comrades (2)
Crusaders (1)	3–1	Knockbreda (2)
Dergview (2)	1–2	Ards (2)
Dollingstown (3)	0–4	Harland & Wolff Welders (2)
Glentoran (1)	1–0	PSNI (3)
Institute (2)	5–2	Sport & Leisure Swifts (3)
Larne (2)	1–4 (aet)	Portadown (1)
Limavady United (3)	2–1	Bangor (2)
Linfield (1)	5–0	Glebe Rangers (3)
Moyola Park (3)	1–4 (aet)	Ballymena United (1)
2 September 2015
Cliftonville (1)	2–1	Dundela (3)
Newington YC (3)	0–3	Dungannon Swifts (1)
Warrenpoint Town (1)	5–1	Lisburn Distillery (2)
15 September 2015
Glenavon (1)	3–3 (aet) (2–3p)	Annagh United (2)

Seeded	Unseeded
Ards; Ballinamallard United; Ballymena United; Bangor; Carrick Rangers; Cliftonville; Coleraine; Crusaders; Dungannon Swifts; Glenavon; Glentoran; Harland & Wolff Welders; Institute; Linfield; Portadown; Warrenpoint Town	Annagh United; Ballyclare Comrades; Banbridge Town; Dergview; Dollingstown; Dundela; Glebe Rangers; Knockbreda; Larne; Limavady United; Lisburn Distillery; Lurgan Celtic; Moyola Park; Newington YC; PSNI; Sport & Leisure Swifts

=== Third round ===
The 16 winners from the second round matches entered this round. With no seeding, the third round fixtures were determined by a random draw, and took place on 14 October 2015. Limavady United were the lowest-ranked club to reach the third round, as the last remaining representative from the third tier.

14 October 2015	Annagh United (2)	0 – 2	Ards (2)	Tandragee Road, Portadown
19:45 BST		NIFL	Arthurs 27'; Warwick 49'	Referee: Raymond Hetherington

14 October 2015	Coleraine (1)	1 – 1 (a.e.t.) (3 – 1 p)	Harland & Wolff Welders (2)	The Showgrounds, Coleraine
19:45 BST	McLaughlin 40'	NIFL	Deans 19'	Referee: Ross Dunlop

14 October 2015	Crusaders (1)	3 – 4 (a.e.t.)	Institute (2)	Seaview, Belfast
19:45 BST	O'Flynn 22'; Mitchell 50' (pen.), 90+3' (pen.)	NIFL	Curry 3'; Friel 44'; McKibbin 85' (o.g.); Brown 116'	Referee: Steven Taylor

14 October 2015	Dungannon Swifts (1)	3 – 3 (a.e.t.) (3 – 4 p)	Cliftonville (1)	Stangmore Park, Dungannon
19:45 BST	McElroy 85', 105'; Teggart 92'	NIFL	J.Donnelly 9', 98'; M.Donnelly 102'	Referee: Raymond Crangle

14 October 2015	Glentoran (1)	3 – 1	Carrick Rangers (1)	The Oval, Belfast
19:45 BST	Gordon 3', 73'; Allen 87'	NIFL	McCaul 14'	Referee: Mervyn Smyth

14 October 2015	Limavady United (3)	0 – 1	Ballymena United (1)	The Showgrounds, Limavady
19:45 BST		NIFL	Taylor 30'	Referee: John Deighan

14 October 2015	Linfield (1)	0 – 1	Ballinamallard United (1)	Windsor Park, Belfast
19:45 BST		NIFL	Lafferty 70'	Referee: Evan Boyce

14 October 2015	Portadown (1)	1 – 2	Warrenpoint Town (1)	Shamrock Park, Portadown
19:45 BST	Conaty 18'	NIFL	Miskelly 53' (o.g.); Murray 57' (pen.)	Referee: Ian McNabb

=== Quarter-finals ===
The 8 winners from the third round matches entered the quarter-finals. As the only two clubs from outside the top-flight to reach the quarter-finals, the two second-tier sides – Ards and Institute – were the lowest-ranked sides remaining in the competition.

18 November 2015	Ards (2)	2 – 2 (a.e.t.) (7 – 6 p)	Ballinamallard United (1)	Clandeboye Park, Bangor
19:45 GMT	McAllister 70'; McKee 107'	BBC Sport	Currie 7'; Courtney 96'

18 November 2015	Ballymena United (1)	1 – 2	Coleraine (1)	The Showgrounds, Ballymena
19:45 GMT	McVey 89'	BBC Sport	McLaughlin 15', 71'

18 November 2015	Cliftonville (1)	3 – 2	Glentoran (1)	Solitude, Belfast
19:45 GMT	McDaid 58'; Catney 63'; McCullough 66' (o.g.)	BBC Sport	Addis 12'; Allen 69'

18 November 2015	Institute (2)	1 – 2	Warrenpoint Town (1)	Riverside Stadium, Drumahoe
19:45 GMT	Brown 28'	BBC Sport	M.Hughes 40'; D.Hughes 63' (pen.)

=== Semi-finals ===
The 4 quarter-final winners entered this round. The semi-final draw took place on 21 November 2015, with the matches played on 15 December 2015. As the only club from outside the top-flight to reach the semi-finals, Ards were the lowest-ranked side remaining in the competition at this stage.

15 December 2015	Ards (2)	2 – 2 (a.e.t.) (5 – 3 p)	Coleraine (1)	Clandeboye Park, Bangor
19:45 GMT	McKee 65', 85'	NIFL	McLaughlin 19', 50'	Referee: Keith Kennedy
	Penalties
	Cully (penalty scored); Lambe (penalty scored); Dorrian (penalty scored); Carson (penalty scored); McKee (penalty scored)		Morrow (penalty scored); Higgins (penalty scored); McLaughlin (penalty missed); Kane (penalty scored)

15 December 2015	Warrenpoint Town (1)	0 – 1 (a.e.t.)	Cliftonville (1)	Milltown, Warrenpoint
19:45 GMT		NIFL	J.Donnelly 92'	Referee: Arnold Hunter

=== Final ===
The final was played on 13 February 2016 at Solitude. Cliftonville became the first club ever to reach four consecutive League Cup finals, and the first club ever to win four consecutive Cups. Ards became only the second club from outside the top flight to reach the final in the competition's history, and the first since Portadown (who were in the second tier at the time) did so in 2008–09.

13 February 2016
17:30 GMT

Ards (2)	0 – 3	Cliftonville (1)
	NIFL	M. Donnelly 35'; McDaid 62'; Garrett 83'

Solitude, Belfast
Referee: Andrew Davey

== See also ==
- 2015–16 NIFL Premiership
- 2015–16 NIFL Championship
- 2015–16 Irish Cup
