= 2014–15 Northern Ireland Football League Cup =

WASP Solutions League Cup

Tournament details
- Country: Northern Ireland
- Teams: 41

Final positions
- Champions: Cliftonville (4th win)
- Runners-up: Ballymena United

Tournament statistics
- Matches played: 40
- Goals scored: 163 (4.08 per match)

The 2014–15 Northern Ireland Football League Cup (known as the WASP Solutions League Cup for sponsorship purposes) was the 29th edition of the Northern Ireland Football League Cup, Northern Ireland's secondary football knockout cup competition, and the second season of the competition under the control of the Northern Ireland Football League. It was contested by the 12 members of the NIFL Premiership and the 29 members of the NIFL Championship. The competition began on 12 August 2014 with the first round, and concluded on 24 January 2015 with the final.

Cliftonville were the defending champions, after they retained the trophy by defeating Crusaders 3–2 on penalties following a 0–0 draw after extra time in the 2014 final to win the cup for the second consecutive season. This season, Cliftonville successfully retained the Cup once again, defeating Ballymena United 3–2 in the final to win the Cup for the third consecutive season and the fourth time overall. They became only the second club to win the competition in three consecutive seasons, emulating Linfield's feat of three consecutive wins in 1997–98, 1998–99 and 1999–2000.

== Format ==
The competition was played in a straight knockout format and was open to all members of the NIFL Premiership and both divisions of the NIFL Championship. The top 16 ranked clubs from last season received byes into the second round, which included the 12 members of the 2013–14 NIFL Premiership and the top four ranked clubs from the 2013–14 NIFL Championship. Of the remaining 25 Championship clubs, 18 of them entered the competition in the first round, with the other seven given byes into the second round. Replays were not used in the competition, with all matches using extra time and penalties to determine the winner if necessary.

Round	Draw date	First match date	Fixtures	Clubs
First round	24 July 2014	12 August 2014	9	41 → 32
Second round	13 August 2014	25 August 2014	16	32 → 16
Third round	30 August 2014	7 October 2014	8	16 → 8
Quarter-finals	11 October 2014	11 November 2014	4	8 → 4
Semi-finals	15 November 2014	16 December 2014	2	4 → 2
Final	N/A	24 January 2015	1	2 → 1

=== Changes from 2013–14 ===
Killymoon Rangers were relegated from the NIFL Championship at the end of the previous season, and were replaced in the competition by Dollingstown, who made their League Cup debut this season following their promotion to the Championship for the first time. The number of competing clubs in the League Cup fell by one to 41 this season following Chimney Corner's resignation from the Championship. In July 2014, the club announced that they would be resigning to join the Ballymena & Provincial League for the 2014–15 season. As a result, the first round of the competition was adjusted to contain nine matches and seven byes, instead of the usual ten matches and six byes to make up the requisite number of 32 clubs in the second round.

== First round ==
The draw for the first round was made randomly and included 25 of the 29 NIFL Championship clubs, with the top four ranked clubs from the 2013–14 NIFL Championship not entering until the second round. 7 of the 25 Championship clubs received a bye into the second round, leaving the remaining 18 Championship clubs in the first round to play a total of nine ties. The draw took place on 24 July 2014, with the matches being played on 12 August 2014. The seven clubs to receive byes were: Ballymoney United, Dollingstown, Donegal Celtic, Harland & Wolff Welders, Larne, Lisburn Distillery and Wakehurst.

Team 1	Score	Team 2
12 August 2014
Annagh United (3)	4–2; Report	Dergview (2)
Ballyclare Comrades (2)	1–0; Report	Limavady United (3)
Banbridge Town (3)	1–2	Newington YC (3)
Coagh United (3)	1–3	Carrick Rangers (2)
Glebe Rangers (3)	4–1; Report	Lurgan Celtic (3)
Loughgall (2)	8–2	Tobermore United (3)
Moyola Park (3)	1–1 (aet) (5–4 p)	Sport & Leisure Swifts (3)
Portstewart (3)	5–0	Queen's University (3)
PSNI (2)	2–1	Armagh City (2)

== Second round ==
The second round draw was completed on 13 August 2014, with the matches played on 25 August 2014. The draw was made up of the remaining 32 clubs, with a seeding system in place for this round. The 12 members of the 2013–14 NIFL Premiership entered this round as seeds, along with the top four ranked clubs from the 2013–14 NIFL Championship. The nine winners from the first round matches, and the seven clubs to receive byes into the second round were unseeded.

Team 1	Score	Team 2
25 August 2014
Annagh United (3)	2–5	Portadown (1)
Ballyclare Comrades (2)	1–0	Linfield (1)
Ballymena United (1)	3–0	Newington YC (3)
Ballymoney United (3)	0–5	Ballinamallard United (1)
Bangor (2)	2–0	Portstewart (3)
Cliftonville (1)	6–0	Wakehurst (3)
Coleraine (1)	3–0	Larne (2)
Crusaders (1)	6–1	Glebe Rangers (3)
Dundela (2)	0–3	Carrick Rangers (2)
Glenavon (1)	3–1	Lisburn Distillery (2)
Institute (1)	2–0	Dollingstown (3)
Knockbreda (2)	4–0; Report	Donegal Celtic (2)
Loughgall (2)	0–1	Dungannon Swifts (1)
Moyola Park (3)	1–2	Glentoran (1)
PSNI (2)	1–4	Ards (2)
Warrenpoint Town (1)	1–2	Harland & Wolff Welders (2)

Seeded	Unseeded
Ards; Ballinamallard United; Ballymena United; Bangor; Cliftonville; Coleraine; Crusaders; Dundela; Dungannon Swifts; Glenavon; Glentoran; Institute; Knockbreda; Linfield; Portadown; Warrenpoint Town	Annagh United; Ballyclare Comrades; Ballymoney United; Carrick Rangers; Dollingstown; Donegal Celtic; Glebe Rangers; Harland & Wolff Welders; Larne; Lisburn Distillery; Loughgall; Moyola Park; Newington YC; Portstewart; PSNI; Wakehurst

== Third round ==
The 16 winners from the second round matches entered this round. The third round draw was completed on 30 August 2014, with the matches played on 7 October 2014. Six clubs from the second tier reached this stage, but there were no representatives from the third tier. A number of ties were switched after the original draw.

7 October 2014	Ballymena United (1)	3 – 1	Ballyclare Comrades (2)	Ballymena Showgrounds, Ballymena
19:45 GMT	Tipton 34' (pen.), 54', 79' (pen.)	Report	Reid 21'	Referee: Tim Marshall

7 October 2014	Bangor (2)	4 – 1	Harland & Wolff Welders (2)	Clandeboye Park, Bangor
19:45 GMT	Forsythe 27', 70', 90'; Youle 46'	Report	Middleton 2'	Referee: Raymond Crangle

7 October 2014	Cliftonville (1)	4 – 1	Carrick Rangers (2)	Solitude, Belfast
19:45 GMT	Mulvenna 21', 60'; Knowles 90+2'; M.Donnelly 90+3'	Report	Cherry 54'	Referee: Ian McNabb

7 October 2014	Crusaders (1)	3 – 2	Coleraine (1)	Seaview, Belfast
19:45 GMT	Clarke 70'; O'Carroll 78', 90'	Report	Miskimmin 30'; McCafferty 80'	Referee: Mervyn Smyth

7 October 2014	Dungannon Swifts (1)	3 – 0	Ards (2)	Stangmore Park, Dungannon
19:45 GMT	Wilson 32'; Douglas 34'; Liggett 74'	Report		Referee: Andrew Davey

7 October 2014	Glenavon (1)	1 – 5	Glentoran (1)	Mourneview Park, Lurgan
19:45 GMT	Dillon 22'	Report	Allen 8'; McCaffrey 42' (pen.), 57', 86'; Stewart 81'	Referee: Colin Burns

7 October 2014	Institute (1)	0 – 2	Ballinamallard United (1)	Riverside Stadium, Drumahoe
19:45 GMT		Report	Elding 7' (pen.); Campbell 47'	Referee: Raymond Hetherington

7 October 2014	Portadown (1)	3 – 1	Knockbreda (2)	Shamrock Park, Portadown
19:45 GMT	Murray 25' (pen.); McAllister 55'; Gault 81'	Report	Boyd 87'	Referee: Ross Dunlop

== Quarter-finals ==
The 8 winners from the third round matches entered this round. The draw for the quarter-finals was made on 11 October 2014, with the matches played on 11 November 2014. Bangor was the lowest ranked club to reach the quarter-finals, as the only representative from outside the top flight.

11 November 2014	Ballinamallard United (1)	1 – 1 (a.e.t.) (4 – 1 p)	Glentoran (1)	Ferney Park, Ballinamallard
19:45 GMT	Lafferty 14'	Report	Allen 76'	Referee: Ross Dunlop

11 November 2014	Ballymena United (1)	3 – 1	Dungannon Swifts (1)	Ballymena Showgrounds, Ballymena
19:45 GMT	Kane 21'; Gawley 33'; Boyce 83'	Report	Harpur 40' (pen.)	Referee: Raymond Crangle

11 November 2014	Bangor (2)	4 – 2 (a.e.t.)	Crusaders (1)	Clandeboye Park, Bangor
19:45 GMT	Youle 68'; Hall 80'; Boylan 99', 115'	Report	Adamson 24', 36'	Referee: Ian McNabb

11 November 2014	Cliftonville (1)	2 – 0	Portadown (1)	Solitude, Belfast
19:45 GMT	Gormley 28', 32'	Report		Referee: Colin Burns

== Semi-finals ==
The semi-final draw took place on 15 November 2014, with the 4 quarter-final winners entering this round. Once again, Bangor was the lowest ranked club to reach this stage, as the only representative from outside the top flight. In reaching the semi-finals, Bangor became the first club from outside the top-flight to do so since Portadown in 2008–09.

16 December 2014	Cliftonville (1)	4 – 3	Bangor (2)	Solitude, Belfast
19:45 GMT	McDaid 33'; J.Donnelly 38'; Gormley 64', 75'	BBC Sport; NIFL	Walsh 40'; Cosgrove 60' (o.g.); McDowell 73'	Referee: Andrew Davey

16 December 2014	Ballinamallard United (1)	2 – 3	Ballymena United (1)	Ferney Park, Ballinamallard
20:00 GMT	Campbell 20', 68'	BBC Sport; NIFL	Jenkins 45'; Tipton 58'; Munster 87'	Referee: Raymond Hetherington

== Final ==
The final was played on 24 January 2015 at Windsor Park. Ballymena United reached the final for the first time, while Cliftonville were appearing in their third consecutive final and sixth final overall. Cliftonville completed a successful defence of the cup once again, lifting it for the third consecutive season and the fourth time overall.

24 January 2015
17:30 GMT

Ballymena United (1)	2 – 3	Cliftonville (1)
Cushley 52', 59'	BBC Sport; NIFL	Gormley 1', 37'; M. Donnelly 80'

Windsor Park, Belfast
Referee: Raymond Crangle

== See also ==
- 2014–15 NIFL Premiership
- 2014–15 NIFL Championship
- 2014–15 Irish Cup
