= 2016–17 NIFL Championship =

NIFL Championship
- Season: 2016–17
- Dates: 13 August 2016 – 29 April 2017
- Champions: Warrenpoint Town
- Promoted: Warrenpoint Town
- Relegated: Armagh City; Annagh United
- Matches: 192
- Goals: 665 (3.46 per match)

The 2016–17 NIFL Championship was the first season of the second-tier Irish League since gaining senior status. The fixtures were announced on 7 July 2016. The season began on 13 August 2016 and concluded on 29 April 2017.

On 1 April 2017, Warrenpoint Town came from 0–2 down to defeat Institute 3–2 to clinch the league title and an instant return to the NIFL Premiership for the 2017–18 season.

== Teams ==
The 2016–17 NIFL Championship consisted of 12 teams. Ards were champions of Championship 1 in the previous season and were promoted to the 2016–17 NIFL Premiership. The next highest place team eligible for promotion, fifth-placed finishers Institute were defeated by Ballinamallard United in the Premiership play-off; therefore failing to achieve promotion.

The bottom two teams from the previous season, Lisburn Distillery and Donegal Celtic were relegated to the third-tier NIFL Premier Intermediate League; they were joined by Bangor after they failed to gain the Championship Licence, required for playing at second-tier level. They were replaced by PSNI, runners-up of the (now defunct) Championship 2 in the previous season; champions Limavady United were ineligible for promotion after failing to gain the required licence.

=== Stadia and locations ===
Locations of the 2016–17 NIFL Championship teams
Locations of the Belfast-based 2016–17 NIFL Championship teams

Club	Location	Stadium	Capacity
Annagh United	Portadown	Tandragee Road	1,250
Armagh City	Armagh	Holm Park	3,000
Ballyclare Comrades	Ballyclare	Dixon Park	5,333
Dergview	Castlederg	Darragh Park	1,200
Harland & Wolff Welders	Belfast	Tillysburn Park	3,000
Institute	Drumahoe	YMCA Grounds	1,570
Knockbreda	Belfast	Breda Park	1,000
Larne	Larne	Inver Park	3,000
Loughgall	Loughgall	Lakeview Park	3,000
Lurgan Celtic	Lurgan	Knockramer Park	1,000
PSNI	Belfast	Newforge Lane	1,500
Warrenpoint Town	Warrenpoint	Milltown	1,280

== League table ==
Pos	Team	Pld	W	D	L	GF	GA	GD	Pts	Promotion, qualification or relegation (Note: Teams played each other twice (22 matches), before the league split into two groups (the top six and the bottom six) for the last ten matches.)
1	Warrenpoint Town (C, P)	32	22	6	4	78	35	+43	72	Promotion to the NIFL Premiership
2	Institute	32	16	9	7	64	39	+25	57	Qualification for the promotion play-offs
3	Ballyclare Comrades	32	15	6	11	64	56	+8	51	Qualification for the promotion play-offs
4	PSNI	32	13	10	9	49	44	+5	49	
5	Dergview	32	12	6	14	67	55	+12	42	
6	Loughgall	32	12	3	17	54	59	−5	39	
7	Harland & Wolff Welders	32	15	6	11	52	41	+11	51	
8	Knockbreda	32	14	4	14	56	52	+4	46	
9	Larne	32	11	7	14	52	51	+1	40	
10	Lurgan Celtic	32	12	3	17	56	71	−15	39	
11	Armagh City (R)	32	9	7	16	41	55	−14	34	Qualification for the relegation play-off
12	Annagh United (R)	32	4	7	21	32	107	−75	19	Relegation to the NIFL Premier Intermediate League

Source: NIFL Championship, Soccerway (top six), Soccerway (bottom six)
Rules for classification: 1) Points; 2) Goal difference; 3) Number of goals scored; 4) Head-to-head points; 5) Head-to-head goal difference; 6) Play-off (subject to IFA decision)
(C) Champions; (P) Promoted; (R) Relegated

== Results ==
=== Matches 1–22 ===
During matches 1–22 each team played every other team twice (home-and-away).

Home \ Away	ANN	ARM	BCC	DGV	H&W	INS	KNB	LAR	LOU	LGC	PSNI	WPT
Annagh United	—	3–0	0–4	0–8	1–4	2–2	0–7	0–4	0–5	2–4	0–0	2–2
Armagh City	4–2	—	3–1	1–3	2–2	1–4	4–0	1–0	2–3	1–3	0–1	2–1
Ballyclare Comrades	3–1	2–0	—	5–1	0–2	2–2	1–3	3–2	5–2	2–1	3–2	2–2
Dergview	9–0	4–0	0–2	—	0–3	1–1	2–1	2–0	6–2	3–4	0–0	2–3
Harland & Wolff Welders	1–1	3–0	0–1	1–1	—	0–2	0–2	3–2	1–1	1–0	2–2	1–2
Institute	5–0	2–0	1–1	1–1	3–1	—	3–1	1–1	2–0	2–1	4–0	0–1
Knockbreda	1–2	1–1	0–5	1–2	0–2	1–1	—	1–1	0–2	4–2	3–1	1–2
Larne	4–1	2–1	2–3	3–2	2–1	6–0	3–1	—	1–4	2–0	2–2	0–1
Loughgall	7–0	3–1	2–1	0–4	3–0	1–2	2–3	1–1	—	0–2	3–0	2–2
Lurgan Celtic	3–1	0–2	3–1	3–3	2–3	4–3	3–3	2–0	2–0	—	2–5	2–6
PSNI	3–1	1–1	4–4	1–1	3–1	1–0	0–1	1–1	4–2	3–0	—	1–0
Warrenpoint Town	7–0	1–1	3–3	3–1	1–0	2–1	3–1	4–1	4–1	4–2	3–0	—

Source: NIFL Championship
Legend: Blue = home team win; Yellow = draw; Red = away team win.

=== Matches 23–32 ===
During matches 23–32 each team played every other team in their half of the table twice (home-and-away).

==== Top six ====
Home \ Away	BCC	DGV	INS	LOU	PSNI	WPT
Ballyclare Comrades	—	2–1	2–4	1–0	0–3	1–0
Dergview	1–0	—	1–5	2–0	1–2	2–0
Institute	2–2	2–1	—	1–0	1–1	0–1
Loughgall	4–2	1–0	0–4	—	2–0	1–4
PSNI	1–0	4–1	0–1	1–0	—	1–3
Warrenpoint Town	4–0	4–1	3–2	1–0	1–1	—

Source: NIFL Championship
Legend: Blue = home team win; Yellow = draw; Red = away team win.

==== Bottom six ====
Home \ Away	ANN	ARM	H&W	KNB	LAR	LGC
Annagh United	—	4–4	1–2	1–2	3–1	1–1
Armagh City	0–0	—	0–3	1–2	1–1	3–0
Harland & Wolff Welders	2–0	2–1	—	0–1	1–1	4–1
Knockbreda	6–1	1–0	1–0	—	4–0	1–2
Larne	2–0	0–1	2–3	2–1	—	3–0
Lurgan Celtic	0–2	0–2	2–3	3–1	2–0	—

Source: NIFL Championship
Legend: Blue = home team win; Yellow = draw; Red = away team win.

== Play-offs ==
=== NIFL Premiership play-offs ===
The second and third-placed teams from the Championship, Institute and Ballyclare Comrades respectively, took part in the Premiership play-off semi-final. The winners will then play Carrick Rangers in the play-off final; the winners of this tie will play in the top-flight next season.

=== NIFL Championship play-off ===
The eleventh-placed team from the Championship, Armagh City, played the runners-up from the 2016–17 Premier Intermediate League, Newry City, over two legs for one spot in the 2017–18 NIFL Championship.

2 May 2017
19:45 BST

Newry City	4–0	Armagh City

The Showgrounds, Newry

5 May 2017
19:45 BST

Armagh City	1–3	Newry City

Holm Park, Armagh

Newry City won 7–1 on aggregate and are promoted to the 2017–18 NIFL Championship; Armagh City are relegated to the 2017–18 NIFL Premier Intermediate League.
