= 2015–16 NIFL Championship =

NIFL Championship
- Season: 2015–16

The 2015–16 NIFL Championship (known as the Belfast Telegraph Championship for sponsorship reasons) was the eighth and final season of the competition in this format since its establishment after a major overhaul of the league system in Northern Ireland, and the third season of the league as part of the Northern Ireland Football League (NIFL), which took over from the Irish Football Association (IFA) for the 2013–14 season onwards. The season began on 8 August 2015, and concluded on 30 April 2016.

== Changes from 2014–15 ==
=== Competition changes ===
League restructure proposals to be introduced over a three-season period were approved by the NIFL on 25 June 2014. The second phase, coming into effect this season, amended the Championship rules:

- Club development – a Club Development/Support programme will be developed and implemented to assist clubs to develop their club infrastructure and comply with licensing requirements.
- Championship 2 – following the relegation of Ballymoney United to regional football the previous season, Championship 2 will reduce in size to 14 clubs this season, before reducing further to 12 clubs next season.
- Promotion/relegation play-off – for the second consecutive season, the highest ranked club with a Championship licence, finishing in positions 2–6 in Championship 1 will participate in a promotion/relegation play-off for a place in the Premiership.
- Promotion and relegation – the three lowest ranked clubs (12th, 13th, 14th) will be relegated from Championship 1 and there will be a play-off between the club finishing in 11th position in Championship 1 and the runners-up in Championship 2. There will be no play-off if the club in Championship 2 has not received a licence for senior football. The five lowest ranked clubs (10th to 14th) will also be relegated from Championship 2 to regional football. However, if there is no eligible regional champion for promotion, only four clubs will be relegated with the 10th-placed club reprieved.

=== Team changes ===
Carrick Rangers won the previous season's Championship 1 title, winning promotion back to the top flight for the first time since their relegation in the 2011–12 season. In the bottom two, Dundela and PSNI were relegated to this season's Championship 2, while Lurgan Celtic and Annagh United went in the opposite direction after finishing first and second in Championship 2. For the second successive season, a club was relegated to regional football. Ballymoney United finished bottom of Championship 2 and were relegated to a regional division for the following season. As a result, Championship 2 reduced in size to 14 clubs.

Promoted from Championship 1 to the Premiership

- Carrick Rangers (1st in NIFL Championship 1)

Relegated from the Premiership to Championship 1

- Institute (12th in NIFL Premiership)

Promoted from Championship 2 to Championship 1

- Lurgan Celtic (1st in Championship 2)
- Annagh United (2nd in Championship 2)

Relegated from Championship 1 to Championship 2

- PSNI (13th in Championship 1)
- Dundela (14th in Championship 1)

Relegated from Championship 2 to Level 4 Regional League

- Ballymoney United (15th in Championship 2)

== Championship 1 ==
NIFL Championship 1
- Champions: Ards
- Promoted: Ards
- Relegated: Bangor (demoted); Donegal Celtic; Lisburn Distillery
- Matches: 182
- Goals: 632 (3.47 per match)
- Biggest home win: Armagh City 6–0 Lurgan Celtic (7 November 2015)
- Biggest away win: Lisburn Distillery 1–9 Armagh City (2 April 2016)
- Highest scoring: Loughgall 3–7 Larne (17 October 2015); Lisburn Distillery 1–9 Armagh City (2 April 2016)

=== Stadia and locations ===
Location of teams in the 2015–16 NIFL Championship 1
Location of the Belfast-based teams in the 2015–16 NIFL Championship 1

Club	Stadium	Location	Capacity
Annagh United	Tandragee Road	Portadown	1,250 (100 seated)
Ards	Clandeboye Park	Bangor	2,850 (500 seated)
Armagh City	Holm Park	Armagh	3,000 (330 seated)
Ballyclare Comrades	Dixon Park	Ballyclare	1,800 (500 seated)
Bangor	Clandeboye Park	Bangor	2,850 (500 seated)
Dergview	Darragh Park	Castlederg	1,200 (100 seated)
Donegal Celtic	Donegal Celtic Park	Belfast	2,330 (650 seated)
Harland & Wolff Welders	Tillysburn Park	Belfast	3,000 (100 seated)
Institute	Riverside Stadium	Drumahoe	3,110 (1,540 seated)
Knockbreda	Breda Park	Knockbreda	1,000 (100 seated)
Larne	Inver Park	Larne	1,100 (656 seated)
Lisburn Distillery	New Grosvenor Stadium	Ballyskeagh	7,000 (540 seated)
Loughgall	Lakeview Park	Loughgall	3,000 (180 seated)
Lurgan Celtic	Knockrammer Park	Lurgan	1,000 (100 seated)

=== League table ===
Pos	Team	Pld	W	D	L	GF	GA	GD	Pts	Qualification or relegation (Note: Teams played each other twice (once at home and once away) for a total of 26 matches.)
1	Ards (C, P)	26	17	3	6	59	35	+24	54	Promotion to the NIFL Premiership
2	Harland & Wolff Welders (Note: Harland & Wolff Welders, Armagh City and Knockbreda did not apply for the Promotion Licence required for promotion to the Premiership. As a result, they were ineligible for the promotion play-off.)	26	15	6	5	54	28	+26	51	
3	Armagh City	26	13	5	8	64	36	+28	44	
4	Knockbreda	26	12	7	7	48	32	+16	43	
5	Institute	26	12	6	8	40	20	+20	42	Qualification for the promotion play-off (Note: As the highest-ranked Championship 1 club outside the top two to successfully attain a Promotion Licence, Institute qualified for the promotion play-off against the 11th-placed Premiership club.)
6	Larne	26	12	6	8	64	45	+19	42	
7	Lurgan Celtic	26	11	6	9	40	40	0	39	
8	Ballyclare Comrades	26	9	10	7	44	40	+4	37	
9	Loughgall	26	10	6	10	45	54	−9	36	
10	Bangor (R)	26	10	5	11	44	40	+4	35	Demotion to the NIFL Premier Intermediate League (Note: Bangor were demoted to the third tier as their application for the mandatory second tier Championship Licence was refused. As a result, the highest-ranked Championship 2 club to successfully attain the licence (PSNI) was automatically promoted to replace Bangor in the second tier.)
11	Dergview	26	9	8	9	41	40	+1	35	
12	Annagh United (Note: Limavady United (in Championship 2) applied for the mandatory second tier 'Championship Licence' but were refused. As a result, the 12th-placed Championship 1 club was reprieved from relegation.)	26	7	6	13	37	57	−20	27	
13	Donegal Celtic (R)	26	2	4	20	34	80	−46	10	Relegation to the NIFL Premier Intermediate League
14	Lisburn Distillery (R)	26	2	4	20	18	85	−67	10	Relegation to the NIFL Premier Intermediate League

Source: Northern Ireland Football League, Soccerway
Rules for classification: 1) Points; 2) Goal difference; 3) Goals scored; 4) Head-to-head points; 5) Head-to-head goal difference; 6) Drawing of lots.
(C) Champions; (P) Promoted; (R) Relegated

=== Results ===
Each team will play every other team twice (once at home, and once away) for a total of 26 games.

Home \ Away	ANN	ARD	ARM	BCC	BGR	DGV	DGC	H&W	INS	KNB	LRN	LIS	LGL	LGC
Annagh United		1–3	2–1	1–1	1–3	3–3	2–3	0–5	0–2	1–2	0–5	1–2	3–2	2–3
Ards	4–0		1–0	2–1	2–1	0–2	2–1	3–3	0–2	2–0	2–2	5–2	3–0	1–1
Armagh City	1–1	4–3		4–0	3–4	3–1	2–2	1–2	3–1	2–1	0–1	3–0	4–0	6–0
Ballyclare Comrades	2–2	0–2	2–1		3–1	1–1	3–1	3–3	1–0	1–3	3–2	4–1	1–1	1–3
Bangor	1–3	2–4	2–0	0–1		2–0	5–0	1–2	1–0	2–2	2–1	3–0	2–2	0–3
Dergview	4–4	1–0	0–1	0–4	1–2		2–2	1–1	0–0	1–0	3–0	1–1	2–4	3–1
Donegal Celtic	0–1	2–3	1–3	0–4	1–3	2–6		1–2	1–4	1–2	1–6	1–4	0–1	1–2
Harland & Wolff Welders	3–0	3–4	1–1	3–0	1–0	3–0	6–2		3–0	1–0	2–1	1–0	2–0	0–2
Institute	0–1	1–2	2–0	1–1	0–0	0–0	3–1	2–0		4–0	1–1	3–0	2–0	3–0
Knockbreda	3–3	2–0	1–3	2–2	1–0	3–0	3–3	1–0	1–0		3–0	2–2	2–2	0–0
Larne	2–0	1–6	4–4	0–0	1–1	3–2	5–0	2–1	1–3	0–3		6–1	2–2	1–0
Lisburn Distillery	0–3	0–3	1–9	1–1	2–2	0–3	0–3	0–3	0–4	0–3	0–7		1–5	0–4
Loughgall	1–0	2–0	3–3	3–2	4–3	0–2	3–1	2–2	1–0	0–7	3–7	3–0		0–1
Lurgan Celtic	1–2	1–2	0–2	2–2	2–1	0–2	3–3	1–1	2–2	2–1	2–3	2–0	2–1	

Source: NI Football League
Legend: Blue = home team win; Yellow = draw; Red = away team win.

== Championship 2 ==
NIFL Championship 2
- Champions: Limavady United
- Promoted: PSNI
- Relegated: Coagh United; Dollingstown; Glebe Rangers; Portstewart; Wakehurst
- Matches: 182
- Goals: 575 (3.16 per match)
- Biggest home win: PSNI 7–0 Moyola Park (30 April 2016)
- Biggest away win: Banbridge Town 0–6 Sport & Leisure Swifts (5 September 2015)
- Highest scoring: Queen's University 4–5 Portstewart (28 November 2015)

=== Stadia and locations ===
Location of teams in the 2015–16 NIFL Championship 2
Location of the Belfast-based teams in the 2015–16 NIFL Championship 2

Club	Stadium	Location	Capacity
Banbridge Town	Crystal Park	Banbridge	1,500 (100 seated)
Coagh United	Hagan Park	Coagh	2,000 (179 seated)
Dollingstown	Planters Park	Lurgan	1,000 (100 seated)
Dundela	Wilgar Park	Belfast	2,500 (100 seated)
Glebe Rangers	Riada Stadium	Ballymoney	5,752 (218 seated)
Limavady United	The Showgrounds	Limavady	1,000 (174 seated)
Moyola Park	Mill Meadow	Castledawson	1,000 (200 seated)
Newington YC	Seaview	Belfast	3,383 (all seated)
Portstewart	Seahaven	Portstewart	1,000 (100 seated)
PSNI	Newforge Lane	Belfast	500 (112 seated)
Queen's University	Dub Stadium	Belfast	1,000 (100 seated)
Sport & Leisure Swifts	Glen Road Heights	Belfast	500 (215 seated)
Tobermore United	Fortwilliam Park	Tobermore	1,500 (100 seated)
Wakehurst	Mill Meadow	Castledawson	1,000 (200 seated)

=== League table ===
Pos	Team	Pld	W	D	L	GF	GA	GD	Pts	Qualification or relegation (Note: Teams play each other twice (once at home and once away) for a total of 26 matches.)
1	Limavady United (Note: Limavady United were ineligible for promotion as their application for the mandatory second tier licence was refused.) (C)	26	18	5	3	66	27	+39	59	
2	PSNI (P)	26	18	5	3	59	23	+36	59	Promotion to the NIFL Championship (Note: Bangor (in Championship 1) were demoted to the third tier as they failed to apply for the mandatory second tier 'Championship Licence'. As a result, PSNI, the highest-ranked Championship 2 club to successfully attain the licence was automatically promoted to replace Bangor in the second tier.)
3	Sport & Leisure Swifts	26	13	8	5	59	28	+31	47	
4	Tobermore United	26	13	5	8	38	31	+7	44	
5	Moyola Park	26	12	5	9	40	34	+6	41	
6	Banbridge Town	26	9	9	8	35	34	+1	36	
7	Queen's University	26	10	6	10	35	37	−2	36	
8	Dundela	26	11	3	12	38	47	−9	36	
9	Newington YC	26	9	7	10	38	38	0	34	
10	Dollingstown (R)	26	9	7	10	46	51	−5	34	Relegation to the tier 4 regional leagues
11	Glebe Rangers (R)	26	9	5	12	34	46	−12	32	Relegation to the tier 4 regional leagues
12	Coagh United (R)	26	6	4	16	28	54	−26	22	Relegation to the tier 4 regional leagues
13	Portstewart (R)	26	6	3	17	34	58	−24	21	Relegation to the tier 4 regional leagues
14	Wakehurst (R)	26	1	4	21	25	67	−42	7	Relegation to the tier 4 regional leagues

Updated to match(es) played on 30 April 2016. Source: Northern Ireland Football League, Soccerway
Rules for classification: 1) Points; 2) Goal difference; 3) Goals scored; 4) Head-to-head points; 5) Head-to-head goal difference; 6) Drawing of lots.
(C) Champions; (P) Promoted; (R) Relegated

=== Results ===
Each team will play every other team twice (once at home, and once away) for a total of 26 games.

Home \ Away	BBT	COA	DOL	DND	GBE	LIM	MOY	NTN	PST	PSNI	QUE	SLS	TOB	WAK
Banbridge Town		1–2	1–1	2–0	0–1	2–0	0–3	1–1	2–0	1–1	0–1	0–6	3–4	1–0
Coagh United	1–1		2–1	2–3	0–0	2–5	1–3	1–1	1–0	1–0	1–4	0–1	0–1	1–0
Dollingstown	1–5	3–1		4–0	2–2	0–1	1–0	3–3	3–0	1–2	1–2	2–2	0–0	4–2
Dundela	0–1	3–1	2–3		3–2	0–2	0–3	1–0	3–1	0–1	1–1	2–5	4–0	3–2
Glebe Rangers	1–0	3–2	3–4	3–1		0–4	1–3	1–1	1–3	1–2	1–0	0–4	2–1	2–1
Limavady United	2–2	4–1	3–1	2–0	1–1		1–0	4–0	3–1	4–2	1–1	2–2	2–0	5–1
Moyola Park	0–0	3–0	6–1	0–0	1–0	0–4		0–3	2–0	0–1	1–1	1–1	2–2	4–1
Newington YC	0–0	3–1	5–2	0–1	4–1	0–4	2–0		2–0	1–1	0–1	1–2	2–3	1–0
Portstewart	1–3	0–2	2–2	1–3	3–1	2–3	3–0	3–4		0–3	2–1	1–1	2–5	2–2
PSNI	3–3	3–0	3–1	3–2	1–0	3–0	7–0	3–0	5–0		4–0	4–2	2–0	2–0
Queen's University	1–1	3–2	0–2	0–0	0–3	0–2	3–2	1–0	4–5	4–0		1–2	0–2	3–1
Sport & Leisure Swifts	0–2	4–0	1–1	1–3	3–1	4–1	1–2	1–1	1–0	0–0	0–0		0–2	7–1
Tobermore United	3–1	2–1	2–0	5–0	0–1	1–1	0–1	2–1	1–0	1–1	1–0	0–4		0–1
Wakehurst	1–2	2–2	1–2	2–3	2–2	1–5	0–3	1–2	0–2	1–2	2–3	0–4	0–0	

Updated to match(es) played on 30 April 2016. Source: NI Football League
Legend: Blue = home team win; Yellow = draw; Red = away team win.
