= List of Northern Ireland football transfers summer 2017 =

This is a list of Northern Irish football transfers for the 2017 Summer Transfer Window.

== Danske Bank Premiership ==
=== Ards ===
In:

No.	Pos.	Nation	Player
—	DF	IRL	David Elebert (from Glenavon)
—	FW	NIR	Johnny Frazer (from Linfield)
—	FW	NIR	Michael McLellan (from Linfield)
—	MF	NIR	Scott Davidson (from HW Welders)
—	MF	NIR	Scott Johnston (from HW Welders)
—	MF	NIR	Nathan Hanley (from Carrick Rangers)
—	DF	NIR	Reece Glendinning (on loan from Linfield)

Out:

No.	Pos.	Nation	Player
—	MF	NIR	Ross Arthurs (released)
—	MF	NIR	Gerard McMullan (to Donegal Celtic)
—	GK	NIR	Liam McAuley (to Lurgan Celtic)
—	DF	NIR	Josh Doherty (released)
—	DF	NIR	Kevin Bradley (released)
—	DF	NIR	Emmet Friars (to Ballymena United)
—	MF	NIR	David McCullough (to Portadown)
—	MF	NIR	Gary Warwick (to Lurgan Celtic)
—	DF	NIR	Stuart McMullan (to Carrick Rangers)
—	FW	NIR	Jordan Hughes (released)

=== Ballinamallard United ===
In:

No.	Pos.	Nation	Player
—	MF	NIR	Richard Clarke (from Crusaders)
—	MF	NIR	Blaine Burns (from Dergview)
—	MF	BUL	Plamen Kolev (from (Bulgaria) Sozopol)
—	MF	IRL	Ciarán Martyn (from Glenavon)
20	DF	NIR	Matty Smyth (from (Scotland) Dundee)
22	DF	NIR	Aaron Canning (on loan from Glenavon)

Out:

No.	Pos.	Nation	Player
—	DF	NIR	Chris Crilly (retired)
—	MF	NIR	Shane McCabe (retired)
—	FW	NIR	Ryan Mayse (to Dungannon Swifts)
—	FW	NIR	Warner Mullen (to Lurgan Celtic)

=== Ballymena United ===
In:

No.	Pos.	Nation	Player
—	GK	NIR	Ross Glendinning (from Linfield, previously on loan)
—	DF	NIR	Michael Gault (from Crusaders)
—	DF	NIR	Stephen McAlorum (from Glenatoran)
—	DF	NIR	Emmet Friars (from Ards)
—	DF	NIR	Andrew Burns (from Dungannon Swifts)
—	MF	NIR	Steven McCullough (from Carrick Rangers)
—	GK	NIR	Conor Brennan (from (Scotland) Raith Rovers)
—	MF	NIR	Daniel McIlhatton (from Moyola Park)
—	MF	NIR	Jake McNeill (from Knockbreda)

Out:

No.	Pos.	Nation	Player
—	DF	NIR	Kyle McVey (to Portadown)
—	DF	NIR	Stephen McBride (retired)
—	DF	NIR	Denver Gage (to Carrick Rangers)
—	MF	NIR	Gavin Taggart (to Carrick Rangers)
—	FW	NIR	Darren Henderson (Portadown)
—	MF	SCO	Allan Jenkins (released)
—	DF	NIR	Michael Kerr (loan return to Crusaders)
—	DF	NIR	Daniel Wallace (loan return to Linfield)

=== Carrick Rangers ===
In:

No.	Pos.	Nation	Player
—	FW	NIR	Chris Trussell (from Ballyclare Comrades)
—	FW	NIR	Martin Maybin (from (United States) Colorado Springs Switchbacks)
—	MF	NIR	Gavin Taggart (from Ballymena United)
—	MF	NIR	Mark Edgar (from Coleraine)
—	DF	NIR	Denver Gage (from Ballymena United)
—	MF	NIR	Stuart McMullan (from Coleraine)
—	FW	NIR	Dale Malone (from Lurgan Celtic)
—	FW	ESP	Mikel Suarez (on loan from Crusaders)
—	MF	NIR	Michael Smith (from Larne)

Out:

No.	Pos.	Nation	Player
—	DF	NIR	Daniel Kelly (to Glentoran)
—	GK	NIR	Brian Neeson (to Cliftonville)
—	FW	NIR	Martin Murray (to Warrenpoint)
—	DF	NIR	Glenn Taggart (retired)
—	MF	NIR	Nathan Hanley (to Ards)
—	FW	IRL	Declan O'Brien (to (Republic of Ireland) Verona FC)
—	MF	IRL	Sean Noble (to (Republic of Ireland) Verona FC)

=== Cliftonville ===
In:

No.	Pos.	Nation	Player
—	FW	NIR	Joe Gormley (from Free agent)
—	DF	IRL	Garry Breen (from Portadown)
—	GK	NIR	Brian Neeson (from Carrick Rangers)
—	DF	NIR	Jamie Harney (from (England) Colchester United)
—	MF	NIR	Liam Bagnall (from Warrenpoint)
—	MF	NIR	Ciarán Caldwell (from Glentoran)
—	GK	NIR	Brett Long (On loan from (Scotland) Dundee United)
—	FW	NIR	Rory Donnelly (from (England) Gillingham)

Out:

No.	Pos.	Nation	Player
—	GK	IRL	Peter Burke (released)
—	DF	IRL	Jason McGuinness (released)
—	FW	IRL	Paul Finnegan ( (Republic of Ireland) Longford Town)
—	FW	NIR	Aaron Haire (to Lurgan Celtic)
—	FW	NIR	Tiarnan McNicholl (to Glentoran)
—	DF	NIR	Eamon Seydak (to Institute)
—	DF	NIR	Caoimhin Bonner (to Institute)

=== Coleraine ===
In:

No.	Pos.	Nation	Player
—	MF	NIR	Josh Carson (from Linfield)
—	MF	NIR	David Kee (from Linfield)
—	DF	NIR	Aaron Traynor (from Warrenpoint)
—	DF	NIR	Stephen O'Donnell (from Institute)
—	MF	NIR	Matthew Kirk (from Newbuildings United)

Out:

No.	Pos.	Nation	Player
—	FW	SCO	Jordan Allan (released)
—	MF	NIR	Neil McCafferty (to Warrenpoint Town)
—	FW	SCO	Gary Twigg (released)
—	MF	NIR	Mark Edgar (to Carrick Rangers)

=== Crusaders ===
In:

No.	Pos.	Nation	Player
—	FW	NIR	Mark McAllister (from Portadown)
—	GK	DEN	Brian Jensen (from (England) Mansfield)
—	DF	NIR	Sean Ward (from Linfield)
—	FW	NIR	Jamie Glackin (from Dungannon Swifts)
—	DF	NIR	Mark McChrystal (from (England) Bristol Rovers)

Out:

No.	Pos.	Nation	Player
—	MF	NIR	Richard Clarke (to Ballinamallard United)
—	DF	IRL	Alan Keane (retired)
—	DF	NIR	Andy Mitchell (to Linfield)
—	DF	NIR	Michael Gault (to Ballymena United)
—	FW	ESP	Mikel Suarez (on loan to Carrick Rangers)

=== Dungannon Swifts ===
In:

No.	Pos.	Nation	Player
—	FW	NIR	Ryan Mayse (from Ballinamallard United)
—	DF	NIR	Liam McMenamin (from Strabane Athletic)
—	GK	NIR	Liam Hughes (from Portadown)
—	FW	NIR	Nathaniel Ferris (from Annagh United)
—	MF	NIR	Grant Hutchinson (Unattached)

Out:

No.	Pos.	Nation	Player
—	FW	NIR	Andy Mitchell (to Glenavon)
—	DF	NIR	Andrew Burns (to Ballymena United)
—	FW	NIR	Jamie Douglas (released)
—	FW	NIR	Jamie Glackin (to Crusaders)
—	DF	NIR	Francis Brennan (to Portadown)
—	FW	NIR	Stefan Lavery (to Portadown)

=== Glenavon ===
In:

No.	Pos.	Nation	Player
—	FW	NIR	Andy Mitchell (from Dungannon Swifts)
—	FW	AUS	Marc Griffin (from (Republic of Ireland) Drogheda United)
—	FW	IRL	Adam Foley (from Portadown)
—	MF	NIR	Sammy Clingan (from Linfield)
—	FW	IRL	Joshua Daniels (from Derry City) (LOI)

Out:

No.	Pos.	Nation	Player
—	MF	NIR	Luke Fisher (to Warrenpoint)
—	FW	NIR	James Gray (released)
—	FW	BRA	Renato Bueno de Vecchi Marins (released)
—	MF	NIR	Andy Kilmartin (to Portadown)
—	DF	IRL	David Elebert (to Ards)
—	MF	IRL	Ciarán Martyn (to Ballinamallard United)
—	DF	NIR	Aaron Canning (On loan at Ballinamallard United)
—	DF	NIR	Kyle Neill (to Portadown)
—	FW	NIR	Joel Cooper (Scholarship in United States)

=== Glentoran ===
In:

No.	Pos.	Nation	Player
—	MF	NIR	John McGuigan (from Warrenpoint)
—	FW	NIR	Dylan Davidson (from (England) Preston North End)
—	DF	NIR	Daniel Kelly (from Carrick Rangers)
—	FW	NIR	Corey McMullan (from Ballyclare Comrades)
—	FW	NIR	Tiarnan McNicholl (from Cliftonville)
—	DF	NIR	Nathan Kerr (from (England) Stevenage)
—	MF	NIR	James Knowles (from Cliftonville)
—	FW	NIR	Robbie McDaid (from (England) York City)
—	MF	NIR	Eoghan McCawl (from (Scotland) St Johnstone)

Out:

No.	Pos.	Nation	Player
—	FW	ESP	Nacho Novo (released)
—	MF	NIR	Ciarán Caldwell (to Cliftonville)
—	FW	IRL	Stephen O'Flynn (to Donegal Celtic)
—	DF	NIR	Stephen McAlorum (to Ballymena United)
—	FW	NIR	David Scullion (to Larne)
—	MF	NIR	Chris Lavery (to Portadown)
—	DF	NIR	Jay Magee (to Dundela)
—	DF	NIR	Ethan Warnock (to (England) Everton)

=== Linfield ===
In:

No.	Pos.	Nation	Player
—	MF	NIR	Robert Garrett (from Portadown)
—	FW	NIR	Jordan Stewart (from (England) Swindon Town)
—	DF	NIR	Andy Mitchell (from Crusaders)
—	DF	NIR	Josh Robinson (from (England) York City)
—	FW	NIR	Louis Rooney (from (England) Plymouth Argyle)
—	FW	ENG	Brandon Adams (On loan from (England) QPR)

Out:

No.	Pos.	Nation	Player
—	FW	NZL	Kris Bright (released)
—	FW	NIR	Michael McLellan (to Ards)
—	MF	NIR	Sammy Clingan (to Glenavon)
—	DF	NIR	Sean Ward (to Crusaders)
—	DF	IRL	Ross Gaynor (released)
—	FW	NIR	Johnny Frazer (to Ards)
—	MF	NIR	TJ Murray (to Warrenpoint)
—	DF	NIR	Seanna Foster (to Warrenpoint)
—	MF	NIR	David Kee (to Coleraine)
—	GK	NIR	Ross Glendinning (to Ballymena United, previously on loan.)
—	FW	NIR	Adam Salley (Portadown)
—	MF	NIR	Josh Carson (to Coleraine)
—	FW	NGA	Kevin Amuneke (to Portadown)
—	DF	NIR	Danny Wallace (to Warrenpoint Town)
—	FW	NIR	Paul Smyth (to QPR)
—	DF	NIR	Reece Glendinning (On loan to Ards)

=== Warrenpoint ===
In:

No.	Pos.	Nation	Player
—	MF	NIR	Sean Mackle (from Portadown)
—	MF	NIR	Luke Fisher (from Glenavon)
—	DF	NIR	Matthew Parker (from Knockbreda)
—	FW	NIR	Darius Roohi (from PSNI)
—	FW	NIR	Darren Murray (from Crumlin Star)
—	GK	NIR	Alan Blayney (from Dundela)
—	DF	NIR	Seanna Foster (from Linfield)
—	FW	NIR	Martin Murray (from Carrick Rangers)
—	MF	NIR	TJ Murray (from Linfield)
—	MF	NIR	Neil McCafferty (from Coleraine)
—	DF	NIR	Danny Wallace (from Linfield)

Out:

No.	Pos.	Nation	Player
—	MF	NIR	Phillip Donnelly (Lurgan Celtic)
—	GK	NIR	Stephen Maguire (released)
—	DF	NIR	Dermot McVeigh (released)
—	MF	NIR	John McGuigan (to Glentoran)
—	DF	NIR	Aaron Traynor (to Coleraine)
—	DF	NIR	Darren King (Newry City AFC)
—	MF	NIR	Liam Bagnall (to Cliftonville)
—	DF	NIR	Matthew Parker (to Ballyclare Comrades)
