= Thomas McBride (footballer) =

Irish footballer (born 1992)

Personal information
- Date of birth: 30 May 1992 (age 34)
- Place of birth: Derry, Northern Ireland
- Position: Midfielder

Youth career
- Maiden City Academy

Senior career*
Years	Team	Apps	(Gls)
2008–2010	Northampton Town		
2010–2011	Derry City	25	(3)
2011–2012	Institute	11	(4)
2012–2013	Finn Harps	28	(6)
2014–2015	Institute	7	(1)
2015–2016	Crewe United		
2016	Dergview		
2017–2019	Finn Harps	25	(1)
2019	Institute	14	(0)
2019–2022	Newbuildings United	0	(0)
2022-2023	Institute	3	(0)

International career
	Republic of Ireland U19	5	(0)
- * Club domestic league appearances and goals

Thomas McBride (born 30 May 1992) is an Irish footballer who most recently played for NIFL Championship club Institute.

He previously played with Derry City, had two stints at Finn Harps and was a youth player for Northampton Town. McBride was also selected for the Northern Ireland Under-18 Schoolboys in 2010. However, he went on to represent the Republic of Ireland at under 19 level.

== Career ==
=== Northampton ===
McBride was scouted and signed as a youth to Northampton Town but after a short spell at the club with no first team appearances, he left by mutual consent, and returned to Northern Ireland.

=== Derry City ===
McBride signed for local team Derry City on trial in 2010 and after several friendlies was signed up on a one-year contract. He regularly featured on the subs bench at the start of the new First Division season but soon won a place in the starting team. He also won Northern Irish under-18 player of the year after netting three goals within three appearances. Following Derry's promotion to the Premier Division and the addition of Ruaidhri Higgins to the midfield McBride lost his place in the team and was dropped to the bench. It was announced in August 2011 that he had left the club after requesting that his contract be terminated as to complete a move to Institute.

=== Institute ===
Immediately after leaving Derry he signed for neighbouring club Institute. He left the club after his contract expired in order to sign for League of Ireland side Finn Harps.

=== Finn Harps ===
McBride signed for Finn Harps in February 2012. He left in May 2013, again by mutual consent.

=== Return to Institute ===
He rejoined the Drumahoe club in June 2014, for the start of his second stint with them, also marking his return to senior football (in the NIFL Premiership). His debut was a 2–2 away draw with Dungannon Swifts on the first day of the 2014–15 NIFL Premiership season. His first competitive goal since rejoining the club came in late August, in a 2–0 home league cup win over Dollingstown. His only league goal of the season came in a 1–1 draw with Glentoran at the Riverside Stadium.

=== Return to Finn Harps ===
In the summer of 2017, McBride returned to Finn Harps as the club looked to remain in the League of Ireland Premier Division, following the departure of Barry Molloy. Despite becoming a mainstay in the side, Harps were relegated, finishing 11th place in the table.

He subsequently agreed a new one-year contract for the 2018 First Division season.

=== Third stint at Institute ===
McBride signed for Institute for his third spell with the club in January 2019.

=== Newbuildings United ===
In October 2019, McBride left Institute for intermediate club Newbuildings United.

=== Fourth stint at Institute ===
On 13 August 2022, he returned to Institute, marking the beginning of his fourth spell at the club, which lasted half a season before he departed once more.
