= 2014–15 NIFL Championship =

NIFL Championship
- Season: 2014–15

The 2014–15 NIFL Championship (known as the Belfast Telegraph Championship for sponsorship reasons) was the seventh season since its establishment after a major overhaul of the league system in Northern Ireland, and the second season that the league is being operated by the Northern Ireland Football League (NIFL), which took over from the Irish Football Association (IFA) for the 2013–14 season onwards. The season began on 8 August 2014 and concluded on 2 May 2015.

Carrick Rangers won the Championship 1 title, winning promotion back to the top flight for the first time since their relegation in the 2011–12 season. Bangor finished as runners-up – the Promotion/relegation play-off place – and faced Warrenpoint Town from the Premiership for a place in next season's Premiership. After a 2–2 draw on aggregate after extra time, Warrenpoint Town won 3–1 on penalties and retained their Premiership status for next season. In the bottom two, Dundela and PSNI were relegated to Championship 2. Lurgan Celtic and Annagh United replaced them in Championship 1, after finishing first and second in Championship 2. For the second successive season, a club was relegated to regional football. Ballymoney United finished bottom of Championship 2 and were relegated to a regional division for the following season.

== Changes from 2013–14 ==
=== Competition changes ===
League restructure proposals to be introduced over a three-season period were approved by the NIFL on 25 June 2014. The first phase, coming into effect this season, amended the Championship rules:

- Promotion/relegation play-off – the highest ranked club with a Championship licence, finishing in positions 2–6 in Championship 1 will participate in a promotion/relegation play-off for a place in the Premiership. Prior to this season the club had to finish as runners-up to take part in the play-off.
- Championship 2 – the bottom two clubs in this season's Championship 2 will be relegated to regional football. If there are no regional champions eligible for promotion, only the bottom club will be relegated. Championship 2 will reduce in size to 14 clubs in the 2015–16 season.

=== Team changes ===
Institute won the Championship 1 title, winning promotion back to the top flight for the first time since the 2009–10 season. They were replaced by Ards, after they had finished bottom of the NIFL Premiership. In the bottom two, Limavady United and Coagh United were relegated to Championship 2. Armagh City and PSNI replaced them in Championship 1, after finishing first and second in Championship 2. For the first time since the Championship was inaugurated in 2008, a club was relegated to regional football. Killymoon Rangers finished bottom of Championship 2 and were relegated to the Ballymena & Provincial League for the following season. Mid-Ulster Football League Intermediate A side Dollingstown took their place in Championship 2, after winning the promotion play-off against Brantwood 6–4 on aggregate. Also leaving Championship 2 was Chimney Corner. In July 2014, the club announced that they would be resigning from the Championship to join the Ballymena & Provincial League for the 2014–15 season. No club replaced them in Championship 2, which meant that the division was reduced in size to 15 clubs.

Promoted from Championship 1 to the Premiership

- Institute (1st in NIFL Championship 1)

Relegated from the Premiership to Championship 1

- Ards (12th in NIFL Premiership)

Promoted from Championship 2 to Championship 1

- Armagh City (1st in Championship 2)
- PSNI (2nd in Championship 2)

Relegated from Championship 1 to Championship 2

- Coagh United (13th in Championship 1)
- Limavady United (14th in Championship 1)

Promoted from Mid-Ulster Football League to Championship 2

- Dollingstown (1st in MUFL Intermediate A Division - promoted via play-off)

Relegated from Championship 2 to Ballymena & Provincial League

- Chimney Corner (14th in Championship 2 – club resigned)
- Killymoon Rangers (16th in Championship 2)

== Championship 1 ==
NIFL Championship 1
- Champions: Carrick Rangers
- Promoted: Carrick Rangers
- Relegated: Dundela; PSNI
- Matches played: 182
- Goals scored: 622 (3.42 per match)
- Biggest home win: Bangor 8–0 PSNI
- Biggest away win: PSNI 0–7 Ards
- Highest scoring: Loughgall 2–7 Bangor

=== Stadia and locations ===
Location of teams in the 2014–15 NIFL Championship 1
Location of the Belfast-based teams in the 2014–15 NIFL Championship 1

Club	Stadium	Location	Capacity
Ards	Clandeboye Park	Bangor	2,850 (500 seated)
Armagh City	Holm Park	Armagh	3,000 (330 seated)
Ballyclare Comrades	Dixon Park	Ballyclare	1,800 (500 seated)
Bangor	Clandeboye Park	Bangor	2,850 (500 seated)
Carrick Rangers	Taylors Avenue	Carrickfergus	6,000 (400 seated)
Dergview	Darragh Park	Castlederg	1,200 (100 seated)
Donegal Celtic	Donegal Celtic Park	Belfast	2,330 (650 seated)
Dundela	Wilgar Park	Belfast	2,500 (100 seated)
Harland & Wolff Welders	Tillysburn Park	Belfast	3,000 (100 seated)
Knockbreda	Breda Park	Knockbreda	1,000 (100 seated)
Larne	Inver Park	Larne	1,100 (656 seated)
Lisburn Distillery	New Grosvenor Stadium	Ballyskeagh	7,000 (540 seated)
Loughgall	Lakeview Park	Loughgall	3,000 (180 seated)
PSNI	Newforge Lane	Belfast	500 (112 seated)

=== League table ===
Pos	Team	Pld	W	D	L	GF	GA	GD	Pts	Promotion or relegation
1	Carrick Rangers (C, P)	26	19	5	2	54	22	+32	62	Promotion to NIFL Premiership
2	Bangor	26	18	6	2	71	32	+39	60	Qualification to promotion play-off
3	Ards	26	16	8	2	61	30	+31	56	
4	Harland & Wolff Welders	26	15	5	6	59	37	+22	50	
5	Larne	26	13	3	10	52	36	+16	42	
6	Dergview	26	8	9	9	40	43	−3	33	
7	Armagh City	26	9	5	12	38	48	−10	32	
8	Knockbreda	26	9	3	14	31	43	−12	30	
9	Ballyclare Comrades	26	8	4	14	46	48	−2	28	
10	Lisburn Distillery	26	8	4	14	38	58	−20	28	
11	Loughgall	26	7	6	13	36	54	−18	27	
12	Donegal Celtic	26	5	9	12	35	42	−7	24	
13	PSNI (R)	26	6	5	15	27	64	−37	23	Relegation to NIFL Championship 2
14	Dundela (R)	26	3	4	19	34	65	−31	13	Relegation to NIFL Championship 2

Source: rsssf.com
Rules for classification: 1st points; 2nd goal difference; 3rd goals scored; 4th head-to-head points; 5th head-to-head goal difference
(C) Champions; (P) Promoted; (R) Relegated

=== Results ===
Each team will play every other team twice (once at home, and once away) for a total of 26 games.

Home \ Away	ARD	ARM	BCC	BGR	CRK	DGV	DGC	DND	H&W	KNB	LRN	LIS	LGL	PSNI
Ards		4–1	1–1	1–1	3–2	3–1	1–1	2–1	2–2	2–0	2–1	4–0	5–1	2–1
Armagh City	1–1		3–1	1–2	0–2	1–1	3–2	5–2	0–1	2–0	2–4	3–1	1–0	1–2
Ballyclare Comrades	1–1	4–0		1–2	0–2	2–2	2–2	3–1	3–0	0–1	0–2	1–2	1–2	1–0
Bangor	2–3	2–0	3–1		1–1	4–1	4–2	3–1	2–2	4–2	1–1	3–2	2–1	8–0
Carrick Rangers	1–0	3–1	2–0	2–2		3–1	2–0	1–0	4–0	2–1	2–1	3–2	2–0	2–1
Dergview	2–2	2–0	5–3	0–3	0–0		3–3	2–1	1–2	1–0	3–2	3–1	2–0	2–0
Donegal Celtic	1–2	2–3	4–1	0–1	0–1	1–1		1–1	2–6	2–0	2–1	0–1	2–2	0–0
Dundela	1–3	1–1	0–3	3–3	2–5	1–0	3–1		1–1	1–2	0–3	3–4	4–0	1–3
Harland & Wolff Welders	1–2	0–2	4–3	0–1	3–0	2–2	1–0	3–2		2–0	1–3	3–2	3–0	4–1
Knockbreda	3–1	2–0	2–1	2–4	0–5	3–2	1–1	3–1	1–2		2–2	0–2	0–1	4–1
Larne	1–2	4–1	4–1	1–2	1–2	2–0	1–0	3–0	0–5	2–0		1–2	0–3	1–1
Lisburn Distillery	1–3	1–2	2–6	0–3	1–1	1–1	0–0	3–0	0–6	2–0	0–4		1–1	5–1
Loughgall	2–2	1–1	1–2	2–7	1–1	2–1	0–3	4–2	3–3	0–2	2–4	3–1		0–1
PSNI	0–7	3–3	0–4	2–1	1–3	1–1	1–3	3–1	0–2	0–0	0–3	3–1	1–4	

Source: rsssf.com
Legend: Blue = home team win; Yellow = draw; Red = away team win.

== Championship 2 ==
NIFL Championship 2
- Champions: Lurgan Celtic
- Promoted: Lurgan Celtic; Annagh United
- Relegated: Ballymoney United
- Matches played: 210
- Goals scored: 714 (3.4 per match)
- Biggest home win: Lurgan Celtic 9–0 Coagh United
- Biggest away win: Ballymoney United 0–6 Moyola Park; Annagh United 0–6; Limavady United
- Highest scoring: Moyola Park 2–7 Annagh United; Lurgan Celtic 9–0 Coagh United

=== Stadia and locations ===
Location of teams in the 2014–15 NIFL Championship 2
Location of the Belfast-based teams in the 2014–15 NIFL Championship 2

Club	Stadium	Location	Capacity
Annagh United	Tandragee Road	Portadown	1,250 (100 seated)
Ballymoney United	Riada Stadium	Ballymoney	5,752 (218 seated)
Banbridge Town	Crystal Park	Banbridge	1,500 (100 seated)
Coagh United	Hagan Park	Coagh	2,000 (179 seated)
Dollingstown	Planters Park	Lurgan	1,000 (100 seated)
Glebe Rangers	Riada Stadium	Ballymoney	5,752 (218 seated)
Limavady United	The Showgrounds	Limavady	1,000 (174 seated)
Lurgan Celtic	Knockrammer Park	Lurgan	1,000 (100 seated)
Moyola Park	Mill Meadow	Castledawson	1,000 (200 seated)
Newington YC	Seaview	Belfast	3,383 (all seated)
Portstewart	Seahaven	Portstewart	1,000 (100 seated)
Queen's University	Dub Stadium	Belfast	1,000 (100 seated)
Sport & Leisure Swifts	Glen Road Heights	Belfast	500 (215 seated)
Tobermore United	Fortwilliam Park	Tobermore	1,500 (100 seated)
Wakehurst	Mill Meadow	Castledawson	1,000 (200 seated)

=== League table ===
Pos	Team	Pld	W	D	L	GF	GA	GD	Pts	Promotion or relegation
1	Lurgan Celtic (C, P)	28	19	6	3	68	21	+47	63	Promotion to NIFL Championship 1
2	Annagh United (P)	28	18	4	6	73	46	+27	58	Promotion to NIFL Championship 1
3	Limavady United	28	17	5	6	67	32	+35	56	
4	Sport & Leisure Swifts	28	16	5	7	50	34	+16	53	
5	Newington YC	28	15	5	8	40	29	+11	50	
6	Moyola Park	28	14	6	8	58	44	+14	48	
7	Dollingstown	28	12	7	9	53	39	+14	43	
8	Portstewart	28	12	6	10	43	40	+3	42	
9	Queen's University	28	11	7	10	48	34	+14	40	
10	Tobermore United	28	9	7	12	48	45	+3	34	
11	Banbridge Town	28	7	7	14	38	70	−32	28	
12	Glebe Rangers	28	6	6	16	45	64	−19	24	
13	Wakehurst	28	6	4	18	28	68	−40	22	
14	Coagh United	28	3	6	19	29	72	−43	15	
15	Ballymoney United (R)	28	2	5	21	26	76	−50	11	Relegation to Level 4 Regional league

Source: rsssf.com
Rules for classification: 1st points; 2nd goal difference; 3rd goals scored; 4th head-to-head points; 5th head-to-head goal difference
(C) Champions; (P) Promoted; (R) Relegated

=== Results ===
Each team plays every other team twice (once at home, and once away) for a total of 28 games.

Home \ Away	ANN	BMY	BBT	COA	DOL	GBE	LIM	LGC	MOY	NTN	PST	QUE	SLS	TOB	WAK
Annagh United		5–1	0–0	3–2	4–3	5–3	0–6	1–1	1–2	3–2	3–1	1–2	3–4	2–1	2–3
Ballymoney United	3–5		3–3	3–0	2–6	1–1	2–3	0–5	0–6	0–2	1–2	1–2	0–1	2–1	1–2
Banbridge Town	0–4	1–1		4–3	0–4	3–1	0–1	0–0	3–4	0–3	0–2	0–0	3–2	4–1	3–2
Coagh United	0–3	1–1	1–3		0–2	2–1	0–1	2–4	1–1	3–3	0–1	1–4	0–2	2–2	1–0
Dollingstown	1–5	4–0	3–0	6–1		2–2	1–1	1–2	3–1	0–0	1–0	1–1	1–1	4–3	0–1
Glebe Rangers	1–2	2–2	4–0	3–1	1–1		4–1	1–0	3–3	0–1	1–4	0–4	0–3	1–3	8–0
Limavady United	2–2	3–0	3–0	4–0	3–1	2–0		3–4	3–2	2–0	1–2	2–2	3–0	2–0	1–1
Lurgan Celtic	4–0	2–0	2–3	9–0	2–0	4–2	2–0		1–0	0–1	3–0	2–1	5–0	2–2	1–0
Moyola Park	2–7	1–0	5–2	1–0	1–0	4–0	1–5	1–1		2–1	5–2	2–1	1–1	1–1	6–0
Newington YC	0–1	2–1	3–1	3–1	2–0	1–1	0–0	1–4	3–2		2–1	1–0	0–1	0–3	2–0
Portstewart	1–4	1–0	3–0	3–2	1–2	5–1	2–4	1–1	0–1	0–1		3–3	1–1	1–1	3–1
Queen's University	0–1	1–0	2–2	2–2	1–2	3–0	3–2	0–0	2–0	1–0	0–1		1–2	3–2	7–1
Sport & Leisure Swifts	0–0	7–0	4–2	1–2	1–1	3–1	2–0	0–2	1–0	1–3	1–2	1–0		4–1	2–0
Tobermore United	1–3	3–0	8–0	1–0	3–1	1–2	0–3	1–2	1–1	1–1	0–0	1–0	1–2		2–0
Wakehurst	0–3	4–1	1–1	1–1	0–2	3–1	1–6	0–3	1–2	0–2	0–0	3–2	1–2	2–3	

Source: rsssf.com
Legend: Blue = home team win; Yellow = draw; Red = away team win.
