= 2017–18 NIFL Championship =

NIFL Championship
- Season: 2017–18
- Dates: 13 August 2017 - 27 April 2018
- Champions: Institute (1st second-tier senior title)
- Promoted: Institute; Newry City (via play-off)
- Relegated: Lurgan Celtic
- Matches: 192
- Goals: 626 (3.26 per match)
- Biggest home win: PSNI 11–1 Lurgan Celtic (17 February 2018)
- Biggest away win: PSNI 0–5 Ballyclare Comrades (11 November 2017)
- Highest scoring: PSNI 11–1 Lurgan Celtic (17 February 2018)

The 2017–18 NIFL Championship was the second season of the second-tier Irish League since gaining senior status.

== Teams ==
The 2017–18 NIFL Championship was contested by 12 teams. Warrenpoint Town were champions in the previous season and were promoted to the 2017–18 NIFL Premiership. Runners-up Institute won 3–2 on aggregate in the promotion pre-play-off against third-placed Ballyclare Comrades, but were defeated 5–2 on aggregate by Carrick Rangers in the Premiership play-off, therefore remaining in the Championship for this season.

The bottom team from the previous season, Annagh United, were relegated to the third-tier NIFL Premier Intermediate League. They were replaced by Limavady United, winners of the Premier Intermediate League. In addition, the eleventh-placed team from the previous season, Armagh City, were relegated and replaced by third-tier runners-up Newry City, against whom they lost a two-legged play-off.

=== Stadia and locations ===
Locations of the 2017–18 NIFL Championship teams
Locations of the Belfast-based 2017–18 NIFL Championship teams

Club	Location	Stadium	Capacity
Ballyclare Comrades	Ballyclare	Dixon Park	5,333
Dergview	Castlederg	Darragh Park	1,200
Harland & Wolff Welders	Belfast	Tillysburn Park	3,000
Institute	Drumahoe	YMCA Grounds	1,570
Knockbreda	Belfast	Breda Park	1,000
Larne	Larne	Inver Park	3,000
Limavady United	Limavady	The Showgrounds	524
Loughgall	Loughgall	Lakeview Park	3,000
Lurgan Celtic	Lurgan	Knockramer Park	1,000
Newry City	Newry	The Showgrounds	2,275
PSNI	Belfast	Newforge Lane	1,500
Portadown	Shamrock Park	Portadown	3,940 (2,765 seated)

== League table ==
Pos	Team	Pld	W	D	L	GF	GA	GD	Pts	Promotion, qualification or relegation (Note: Teams played each other twice (22 matches), before the league split into two groups (the top six and the bottom six) for the last ten matches.)
1	Institute (C, P)	32	21	5	6	55	36	+19	68	Promotion to the NIFL Premiership
2	Newry City (O, P)	32	17	8	7	58	31	+27	59	Qualification for the promotion play-off
3	Harland & Wolff Welders (Note: Harland & Wolff Welders were ineligible for the promotion play-offs, as they did not apply for the Promotion Licence required for promotion to the NIFL Premiership.)	32	16	8	8	54	42	+12	56	
4	Portadown	32	14	9	9	61	36	+25	51	
5	Ballyclare Comrades	32	15	3	14	56	52	+4	48	
6	Loughgall	32	12	2	18	45	59	−14	38	
7	Larne	32	12	11	9	59	47	+12	47	
8	PSNI	32	11	8	13	55	50	+5	41	
9	Limavady United	32	10	7	15	52	58	−6	37	
10	Knockbreda	32	9	9	14	50	54	−4	36	
11	Dergview (O)	32	9	9	14	49	59	−10	36	Qualification for the relegation play-off
12	Lurgan Celtic (R)	32	3	7	22	32	102	−70	16	Relegation to the NIFL Premier Intermediate League

Source: NIFL Championship, Soccerway (top six), Soccerway (bottom six)
Rules for classification: 1) Points; 2) Goal difference; 3) Number of goals scored; 4) Head-to-head points; 5) Head-to-head goal difference; 6) Play-off (subject to IFA decision)
(C) Champions; (O) Play-off winners; (P) Promoted; (R) Relegated

== Results ==
=== Matches 1–22 ===
During matches 1–22 each team played every other team twice (home and away).

Home \ Away	BCC	DGV	H&W	INS	KNB	LAR	LIM	LOU	LGC	NEW	POR	PSN
Ballyclare Comrades	—	1–1	4–3	2–4	2–3	0–2	2–1	2–1	4–0	0–3	1–0	0–3
Dergview	1–1	—	1–1	1–2	2–2	2–2	0–1	1–5	3–2	2–2	3–1	0–1
Harland & Wolff Welders	1–0	5–1	—	3–2	0–3	6–1	3–2	2–0	1–0	0–0	3–2	2–1
Institute	2–1	2–0	2–1	—	2–1	3–0	2–0	3–0	1–1	0–0	2–2	1–0
Knockbreda	1–2	0–0	1–2	0–1	—	1–3	2–1	0–3	4–2	0–1	1–2	3–0
Larne	1–1	3–0	1–1	0–1	3–1	—	2–1	1–1	2–2	3–2	0–3	2–1
Limavady United	3–5	1–0	3–1	2–2	3–1	1–1	—	3–1	2–3	1–3	1–1	2–1
Loughgall	2–1	2–0	1–2	3–1	0–1	2–1	2–1	—	3–2	0–4	1–4	2–1
Lurgan Celtic	0–1	1–3	2–2	0–1	1–1	2–2	3–3	1–2	—	2–1	1–1	3–0
Newry City	4–1	1–0	1–1	0–1	1–0	3–1	2–2	1–0	5–0	—	1–4	1–2
Portadown	1–2	7–0	0–0	1–2	0–1	2–2	2–1	3–0	6–0	1–4	—	3–0
PSNI	5–0	5–2	1–1	2–3	0–0	1–1	4–1	1–2	2–0	0–3	1–1	—

Legend: Blue = home team win; Yellow = draw; Red = away team win.

=== Matches 23–32 ===
During matches 23–32 each team played every other team in their half of the table twice (home and away).

==== Top six ====
Home \ Away	BCC	H&W	INS	LOU	NEW	POR
Ballyclare Comrades	—	0–2	2–4	2–1	0–3	1–0
Harland & Wolff Welders	2–1	—	1–2	1–0	0–3	1–3
Institute	1–0	1–2	—	3–0	0–1	2–1
Loughgall	3–5	3–1	1–3	—	1–1	1–2
Newry City	2–1	0–3	3–1	1–0	—	0–0
Portadown	2–0	0–0	1–1	2–1	2–1	—

Source: NIFL Championship
Legend: Blue = home team win; Yellow = draw; Red = away team win.

==== Bottom six ====
Home \ Away	DGV	KNB	LAR	LIM	LGC	PSN
Dergview	—	1–1	1–0	3–2	8–0	2–1
Knockbreda	1–4	—	3–3	6–1	7–0	2–2
Larne	3–0	8–0	—	2–1	2–0	1–1
Limavady United	0–0	2–2	1–0	—	6–0	0–0
Lurgan Celtic	1–4	1–1	0–5	0–3	—	2–4
PSNI	3–2	1–0	2–2	3–0	11–1	—

Source: NIFL Championship
Legend: Blue = home team win; Yellow = draw; Red = away team win.

== Play-offs ==
=== NIFL Premiership play-offs ===
The runners-up and third-placed teams from the Championship were set to take part (over two legs) in the Championship promotion pre-play-off. However, the third-placed team, Harland and Wolff Welders, did not apply for a Premiership licence, so the second-placed team Newry City moved directly into the play-off final.

=== NIFL Championship play-off ===
The eleventh-placed team from the Championship, Dergview, played the runners-up from the 2017–18 Premier Intermediate League, Queen's University, over two legs for one spot in the NIFL Championship.

11 May 2018
19:45 BST

Queen's University	0 – 1	Dergview
	BBC Sport

Upper Malone, Belfast

16 May 2018
19:45 BST

Dergview	3 – 1	Queen's University
	BBC Sport

Darragh Park, Castlederg

Dergiew won 4–1 on aggregate and retained their position in the NIFL Championship with Queen's University remaining in the NIFL Premier Intermediate League.
