= Paddy McLaughlin (footballer, born 1979) =

Association football manager from Northern Ireland

Personal information
- Full name: Patrick McLaughlin
- Date of birth: 10 October 1979 (age 47)
- Place of birth: Derry, Northern Ireland
- Position: Centre back

Youth career
- 1997: Derry City

Senior career*
| Years | Team | Apps | (Gls) |
| 1997–2005 | Derry City | | |
| 2005–2007 | Institute | | |
| 2007–2008 | Finn Harps | | |
| 2008–2011 | Coleraine | | |
| 2011 | Finn Harps | | |
| 2011–2015 | Institute | | |

Managerial career
- 2015–2017: Institute (assistant)
- 2017–2019: Institute
- 2019–2023: Cliftonville
- 2023-2024: Derry City (assistant)
- 2024–2025: Glenavon
- * Club domestic league appearances and goals

Patrick McLaughlin (born 10 October 1979) is a Northern Irish football manager and former footballer who is currently Assistant manager at NIFL Championship side Institute.

Beginning his career at Derry City, he went on to play with Institute, Finn Harps, and Coleraine. At 'Stute he served as club captain, leading them to promotion to the Premiership after winning the 2013–14 NIFL Championship.

He retired from playing in 2015 to take on the role of assistant manager under newly appointed Institute boss Kevin Deery. He spent two years as assistant manager before succeeding Deery as manager following his resignation.

In his first season as manager he guided 'Stute back to the top flight of Northern Irish football by winning the 2017–18 NIFL Championship.

After receiving much praise for his team's attacking playing-style during their Premiership return, McLaughlin found himself linked with the vacant managerial positions at a number of clubs including Coleraine, Derry City and Cliftonville.

On 4 February 2019 he was confirmed as the new manager of Cliftonville after being approached for the position 5 days prior.

On 13 March 2022 Paddy McLaughlin guided his Cliftonville side to victory over Coleraine in League Cup final at Windsor Park, to win the club's sixth league cup victory and his first major trophy at football club.

== Honours ==
=== Playing ===
Institute

- NIFL Championship: 2013–14

=== Manager ===
Institute

- NIFL Championship: 2017–18

Cliftonville

- County Antrim Shield: 2019–20
- Irish League Cup: 2021–22
