= Ryan Semple =

Ryan Semple may refer to:

- Ryan Semple (footballer, born 1977), Northern Irish football player for Peterborough United, Derry City, Linfield and Institute FC
- Ryan Semple (footballer, born 1985), English football player for Peterborough United, Lincoln City and Corby Town
- Ryan Semple (skier) (born 1982), Canadian alpine skier
