= Paul Hegarty (disambiguation) =

Paul Hegarty (born 1954) is a Scottish football player and manager.

Paul Hegarty may also refer to:

- Paul Hegarty (Irish footballer) (born 1967), former Irish footballer and current assistant manager
- Paul Hegarty (musician), author, musician, and lecturer in philosophy and visual culture
