= Neil McCafferty =

Irish footballer (born 1984)

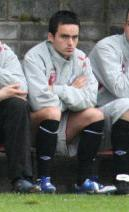
- McCafferty on the Derry City bench

Personal information
- Full name: Neil McCafferty
- Date of birth: 19 July 1984 (age 42)
- Place of birth: Derry, Northern Ireland
- Position: Midfielder

Senior career*
Years	Team	Apps	(Gls)
2000–2005	Charlton Athletic	0	(0)
2003–2004	→ Cambridge United (loan)	6	(0)
2005	→ Rushden & Diamonds (loan)	16	(0)
2005–2006	Rushden & Diamonds	23	(0)
2006–2008	Derry City	8	(0)
2008	Grays Athletic	16	(0)
2008	Finn Harps	15	(2)
2008–2010	Dungannon Swifts	40	(15)
2010–2014	Portadown	98	(3)
2011	→ Ballymena United (loan)	15	(1)
2014–2017	Coleraine	92	(18)
2017–2020	Warrenpoint Town		(0)
- * Club domestic league appearances and goals

Neil McCafferty (born 19 July 1984) is an Irish footballer who last played for NIFL Premiership side Warrenpoint Town.

== Career ==
McCafferty began his career at Charlton Athletic in 2000–01. He can play either central midfield or on the right-hand side. In 2001, McCafferty was called into Charlton's first-team squad to face Manchester United at Old Trafford at just 16 years of age. He was a regular in both Charlton's under-19 and reserve teams and was captain of the reserve side in 2004–2005. Whilst under contract with Charlton, McCafferty also had loan spells at both Cambridge United and Rushden & Diamonds.

At international level, the player was a regular at youth levels from Under-16 to Under-19 with the Republic of Ireland. His appearances for Ireland included the 2003 Oporto Youth Tournament held in Portugal where he represented the Under-19s.

During his spell with Rushden & Diamonds, McCafferty helped the club avoid relegation from the Football League. Having originally signed a one-month deal at Nene Park toward the end of January 2005, his stay was soon extended to three months after a number of impressive performances which aided in steadying the sinking ship.

McCafferty was so popular with Rushden & Diamonds fans that when he was released by Charlton Athletic at the end of the 2004–05 season after failing to break into Alan Curbishley's first-team plans, he was signed by the club that had previously loaned him.

McCafferty signed for his home-town club in July 2006 and made his debut away to Bray Wanderers on 4 August 2006. However, he only managed this one appearance as a substitute before injury ruled him out of the 2006 season. Prior to this and upon his arrival at the club, the Derry City manager at the time, Stephen Kenny was quoted as saying:

Neil is yet another member of a generation of young players who have come of age over the past few seasons at Derry City. Players such as Pat McCourt, Barry Molloy, Mark McChrystal, Ruaidhri Higgins and Kevin Deery are all the same age as Neil and they all played in the Derry and District Youth Leagues before graduating to senior players be it here or in England. Therefore, when I came to Derry I had targeted a number of those players who had been playing in England – Barry Molloy, Ruaidhri Higgins, Paddy McCourt and McCafferty. At the start it was difficult to persuade them to return home but over the past season or so, a return to the Brandywell is now considered a viable option should their careers come to a halt across the Irish Sea.

McCafferty only managed to make eight league appearances for the Candystripes, five coming from the bench.

Late in 2007, McCafferty spent time with Gillingham on trial. He eventually signed for Grays Athletic on 1 January 2008.

On 1 July 2008, Finn Harps announced that McCafferty had signed for the League of Ireland Premier Division side.

On 10 December 2008, Dungannon Swifts manager John Cunningham confirmed that McCafferty would be joining the Swifts squad, but was unavailable to play until the transfer window opened in January.

On 12 June 2010, McCafferty signed for Portadown.

On 28 January 2011, McCafferty signed for Ballymena United on loan until the end of the current season.
