= Kevin Deery =

Irish footballer (born 1984)

Personal information
- Date of birth: 6 December 1984 (age 41)
- Place of birth: Derry, Northern Ireland
- Position: Midfielder

Team information
- Current team: Coleraine

Youth career
- Derry City

Senior career*
Years	Team	Apps	(Gls)
2001–2014	Derry City	99	(7)
Total		99	(7)

International career
2001	Republic of Ireland U21	2	(0)

Managerial career
- 2014–2015: Trojans
- 2015–2017: Institute
- 2017–2018: Sligo Rovers (assistant)
- 2018–2021: Derry City (assistant)
- 2023–2025: Institute
- 2025-: Coleraine (assistant)
- * Club domestic league appearances and goals

Kevin Deery (born 6 December 1984) is an Irish football coach and former player who is the former manager of NIFL Championship side Institute.

== Career ==
He played his entire professional career with his hometown club Derry City, and served as club captain between 2010 and 2014 having been appointed to the role by former Candystripes manager Stephen Kenny.

As captain, he helped guide Derry to promotion back to the top flight of Irish football having been demoted to the League of Ireland First Division due to financial difficulties. He retired in 2014 after a series of injury setbacks and a fall out with then manager Roddy Collins.

After retirement, he began his coaching career, taking on the role of co-manager alongside Paul 'Oxo' McLaughlin at intermediate club Trojans in 2014. There, he won a treble in his first season before accepting the managerial role at Institute following the sacking of Paul Kee.

After guiding 'Stute to two NIFL Championship play-offs in the 2015/16 and 2016/17 seasons, Deery resigned after failing to win promotion. He also spent a brief period as assistant manager at Sligo Rovers before returning to the Brandywell as assistant to Declan Devine.

He made his return to Institute as manager in June 2023, following the resignation of Brian Donaghey. Resigning 2 years later to join Ruaidhri Higgins as his assistant coach at Coleraine FC.
