= John Cunningham (Northern Ireland footballer) =

Northern Irish footballer and coach

John Cunningham (born 30 November 1966) is a football coach and former footballer who played as a winger. He is also known by his nickname "Bugsy".

He is a youth development coach with intermediate club Maiden City, and previously served as assistant manager to Paul Kee at Institute, before being sacked alongside Kee at the end of the 2014/15 season following Stute's relegation from the NIFL Premiership.

In his playing days he started off with Mansfield Town and then after a short spell at Sunderland he moved back to Northern Ireland where he was part of Derry City's team in the League of Ireland. He also had spells at Bangor, Cliftonville, Coleraine and Institute. Until May 2012 he was the first team manager at Lisburn Distillery.

Previously he was a coach at Limavady United, Derry City and Carlisle United. In April 2002 he quit Carlisle United in protest over the sacking of Roddy Collins.
