= Ryan Semple (footballer, born 1977) =

Northern Irish footballer

Ryan Semple (born 2 July 1977) is a football midfielder from Northern Ireland, who plays for Dergview. He is a former Peterborough United, Derry City, Linfield, Institute and Limavady United player. He played for Institute for over 12 years in 3 separate stints.
