= David Bell (footballer, born 1985) =

Irish football player

Personal information
- Date of birth: 13 May 1985 (age 41)
- Place of birth: Buncrana, Ireland
- Position: Left back

Team information
- Current team: Dunmurry Rec

Senior career*
Years	Team	Apps	(Gls)
2000–2004	Rushden & Diamonds	0	(0)
2004–2005	St Patrick's Athletic	30	(0)
2006	Finn Harps	34	(0)
2007–2008	Institute	9	(0)
2008–2010	Limavady United	42	(1)
2010–2012	Crusaders	34	(2)
2011–2012	→ Carrick Rangers (loan)	23	(1)
2012–2013	Carrick Rangers	9	(0)
2013	Lisburn Distillery	0	(0)
- Dunmurry Rec

International career^{‡}
2003	Republic of Ireland U19	6	(0)
- * Club domestic league appearances and goals as of 20 March 2011 ‡ National team caps and goals as of 1 December 2003

David Bell (born 13 May 1985 in Buncrana, County Donegal) is an Irish football player for Northern Irish non league side Dunmurry Recreation.

== Career ==
Bell was spotted by a Rushden and Diamonds scout at an early age whilst playing in an Ulster schools select team in an inter-provincial tournament and was snapped up by the club. He won caps for the Republic of Ireland under-17 - 19 under Sean McCaffrey and Brian Kerr. The left-sided player moved back to his native Ireland in 2004 where he joined St. Patrick's Athletic of Dublin. He spent 2 seasons in Dublin and made 30 appearances for the Premier League outfit. He can play in both defence and midfield.

Signing for Finn Harps at the beginning of the 2006 season, he made his debut against Kildare County on 18 March 2006. He played 34 games for the club, including 1 as a substitute. After spells at Institute and Limavady United, he joined Crusaders.

He made his debut for Crusaders in an Irish Cup tie against Bangor, and won the County Antrim Shield in just his second game.

He joined Carrick Rangers on loan in January 2011.

He then joined Carryduff Colts in the twilight of his career.

== Honours ==
Crusaders

- County Antrim Shield (1): 2009/10

Carrick Rangers

- Ladbrokes.com Championship 1 (1): 2010/11
- WKD Intermidiete Cup (1): 2010/11
