= Declan Devine =

Irish footballer and coach (born 1973)

Personal information
- Date of birth: 15 September 1973 (age 53)
- Place of birth: Derry, Northern Ireland
- Position: Goalkeeper

Youth career
- Ipswich Town

Senior career*
Years	Team	Apps	(Gls)
1992–1995	Omagh Town	25	(0)
1995–1996	Glentoran	18	(0)
1996–1997	Derry City	5	(0)
1997–1998	Omagh Town	3	(0)
1998–2002	Institute	22	(0)
Total		73	(0)

International career
1994	Northern Ireland U21	1	(0)

Managerial career
- 2012–2014: Derry City
- 2015–2018: Northern Ireland U16
- 2019–2021: Derry City
- 2022–2024: Bohemians
- 2024–2026: Glentoran
- * Club domestic league appearances and goals

Declan Devine (born 15 September 1973) is a Northern Irish football coach and former player.

Devine has played for and managed his hometown club Derry City in the League of Ireland Premier Division.

== Playing career ==
Devine began his career with Ipswich Town but was unable to make the breakthrough at Portman Road and returned home. Devine then plied his trade with a number of Irish League clubs as well as Derry City and won the Ulster Young Footballer of the Year Award in 1994 when playing for Roy McCreadie's Omagh Town side. Devine was capped right up to U-21 level with Northern Ireland, winning an U-21 cap in a 0–0 draw against Romania in 1994.

He had success with Glentoran, helping them to defeat Glenavon in the Irish Cup final in the 1995–96 season. However, at the end of that season Devine moved to the Brandywell for a combined fee of £42,000 which included Liam Coyle, where he provided backup to Tony O'Dowd as Derry City went on to win the title.

== Managerial career ==
Having stopped playing at the end of the 2001–02 season, Devine became involved in coaching at an underage level. He returned to Derry City as the Youth Development officer in 2003 and was initially involved in the delivery of the community coaching and Football in the Community programmes which were run by the club at that time. The installation of former teammate, Gavin Dykes, as manager in 2003 meant a promotion for Devine and he took on the role of first team coach. Stephen Kenny opted to retain Devine as first team coach when he arrived at the club the following season, and the back room setup, including Paul Hegarty, guided Derry City to successive second-place finishes as well as success in the FAI Cup, League Cup and memorable European runs. Following this success, Kenny lured Devine to join him at Dunfermline Athletic when he left for East End Park and he was appointed first team coach there on 5 December 2006. Devine described the move as a "massive wrench" but felt for personal reasons that he needed to move on. However, after Stephen Kenny's return to Derry City in late 2007, Devine, too followed him back to the club. He was instrumental in guiding the team to the First Division title and a third-place finish in the 2011 season. Following the departure of Stephen Kenny to Shamrock Rovers in December 2011, Devine was appointed manager of Derry City on 6 January 2012, beating off Willie McStay to land the post. He agreed a two-year deal along with Paul Hegarty who was appointed as his assistant manager. In his first season in charge, the club finished 5th in the league, won the FAI Cup, and were runners-up in the Setanta Sports Cup. In the wake of this success, Devine signed a one-year contract extension to keep him at the club until the end of the 2014 season. At the beginning of his second season in charge, after an opening day defeat to Sligo Rovers, Devine guided his team to a 10-match unbeaten run and top of the table until they were defeated again by Sligo in the second series of fixtures. Devine left by mutual consent at the end of the season despite having qualified for Europe and a 6–0 victory against Limerick. Prior to the 2014 League of Ireland season, Devine was linked with the assistant manager post at champions St. Patrick's Athletic, however he turned this down in favour of becoming an underage coach in the Elite Performance Club NI scheme. Devine, along with former Derry City player Pascal Vaudequin, will work with youth players in the west of Northern Ireland. He returned to managing Derry City in 2019, serving until 2021.

Devine served as manager of Bohemians from October 2022 until March 2024.

Devine served as manager of NIFL Premiership club Glentoran from April 2024 to September 2026 and led the club to one major trophy and two cup finals. He was ultimately sacked after a poor run of results leaving Glentoran 10th in the league.

== Honours ==
=== Managerial ===
Derry City

- FAI Cup: 2012

Glentoran

- County Antrim Shield: 2024–25
