= Paul Hegarty (Irish footballer) =

Irish footballer (born 1967)

Personal information
- Date of birth: 30 May 1967 (age 59)
- Place of birth: Ballindrait, County Donegal, Ireland
- Position: Midfielder

Senior career*
Years	Team	Apps	(Gls)
1987–1992	Derry City	44	(2)
1992–1995	Finn Harps	79	(4)
1995–2000	Derry City	160	(1)
2001	Coleraine	29	(0)
2002–2004	Institute	50	(0)
Total		362	(7)

Managerial career
- 2002–2004: Institute
- 2005–2006: Derry City (assistant)
- 2006–2009: Finn Harps
- 2012–2014: Derry City (assistant)
- 2015: Derry City (caretaker)
- 2016–2022: Finn Harps (assistant)
- 2024: Derry City (assistant)
- * Club domestic league appearances and goals

Paul Hegarty (born 30 May 1967) is an Irish football coach and former player who was most recently the assistant manager of League of Ireland Premier Division club Derry City. 'Heggsy', as he is commonly referred to, has also previously managed nearby clubs Institute and Finn Harps as well as another brief period as assistant to Stephen Kenny at Derry from 2005 to 2006.

== Playing career ==
Hegarty was born in Raphoe, County Donegal, Ireland. He played youth football in the Ulster Senior League before signing with Derry City where he made his League of Ireland debut on 13 September 1987. He went on to become part of the side that won the treble in 1989 before moving to Finn Harps in 1992. Hegarty returned to Derry in 1995 and was a member of the squad that lifted the top flight title in 1997. He finished up his career with Coleraine and Institute, including a spell as a player-manager with the latter. Hegarty was known throughout Ireland as one of the toughest tackling midfielders of his era.

== Coaching career ==
Before becoming the assistant manager to Stephen Kenny at Derry City in 2005, Hegarty had a spell of management at Institute. His desire for his team to do well was evident during every game. This driven and determined attitude is reminiscent of the character Hegarty displayed on the field as a player. While at Derry, Hegarty was ever present on the sidelines as the club went on to win the FAI Cup, finish second in the League of Ireland and enjoyed an historic run in the UEFA Cup, being eliminated in the first round by Paris St. Germain.

On 15 December 2006, Hegarty announced that he would be moving on from his role as assistant manager at Derry due to difficulties relating to Pat Fenlon's new training schedules for the 2007 season. With the managerial slot left empty at Finn Harps since Anthony Gorman's departure, Hegarty looked like the favourite to take the role at Finn Park. On 20 December 2006, Hegarty was named the new boss at Finn Harps after signing a two-year deal with the club. Whilst he guided Finn Harps to promotion via the playoffs in his first season, he also presided over their immediate return to the First Division of the League of Ireland. He was given a four-match touchline ban in April 2008 for his reaction to the referee's decision to send off Finn Harps' Kevin Ramsey. On 11 May 2009, Hegarty left the club, citing "personal reasons", and was replaced as manager by James Gallagher.

Upon the departure of Stephen Kenny in 2011, Hegarty interviewed for the vacant managerial position at Derry City but was unsuccessful. Instead, he joined the club on 6 January 2012 as assistant to their new manager Declan Devine, who was the previous assistant manager to Stephen Kenny as well as a former teammate and colleague of Hegarty.

On 29 July 2015, Hegarty rejoined Derry City as assistant manager to Peter Hutton. He took over as caretaker at Derry on 15 September 2015, after Hutton left the club. Hegarty declined to take up the managerial position on a permanent basis, leaving the club the following month.

On 13 June 2016, Hegarty rejoined Finn Harps, this time as assistant manager to Ollie Horgan. In 2021, Hegarty was linked with the Derry City job after Declan Devine left the post by mutual consent. After Ollie Horgan's departure in 2022, Hegarty was replaced as assistant manager by the new manager, Dave Rogers, who appointed Darren Murphy in his place.

On 9 February 2024, Derry City announced that Hegarty had been appointed as assistant manager to Ruaidhrí Higgins, succeeding Paddy McLaughlin. Higgins was replaced as manager by Tiernan Lynch on 18 November 2024, with Lynch's older brother Seamus coming in as assistant.

== Honours ==
=== Player ===
Derry City

- League of Ireland Premier Division: 1988–89, 1996–97
- FAI Cup: 1988-89
- League of Ireland Cup: 1988–89, 1990–91, 1999–2000
