= MUFL =

MUFL may refer to:

- Florida Airport (Cuba)
- Mandalay University of Foreign Languages
- Mid-Ulster Football League
