= Paul James Kee =

Northern Irish footballer

Personal information
- Full name: Paul Kee
- Date of birth: 21 February 1967 (age 59)
- Place of birth: Derry, Northern Ireland
- Position: Midfielder

Senior career*
Years	Team	Apps	(Gls)
1983–1985	Mansfield Town	1	(0)
1985–1986	Nottingham Forest	0	(0)
1986	Southampton	0	(0)
1986	Charlton Athletic	0	(0)
1987	Linfield	0	(0)
1988	Coleraine	15	(4)
1989	Crusaders	8	(1)
Total		24	(5)

Managerial career
- 1993–1994: Omagh Town
- 1999–2002: Institute
- 2002–2003: Carlisle United (assistant)
- 2005–2006: Limavady United
- 2006–2012: Irish Football Association (coach)
- 2008–2011: Northern Ireland U17
- 2011–2015: Institute
- Harland and Wolff Welders
- * Club domestic league appearances and goals

Paul Kee (born 21 February 1967) is a Northern Irish former footballer who played in numerous positions, including striker and midfielder. He is the former manager of Institute Football Club and current manager of Harland and Wolf Welders.

== Football career ==
Kee, who was born in Derry, Northern Ireland, began his professional career with Mansfield Town, signing in the summer of 1983. He made his League debut for Mansfield in April 1985 against Chester City. He remained with Mansfield for the remainder of the season and was then signed by Brian Clough for Nottingham Forest.

He left Forest in 1986 and had spells with Southampton and Charlton before returning home, where he signed for Linfield in 1987. The spell with Linfield came to an end and he signed for Coleraine, with whom he won the Irish League Cup in 1987, defeating Portadown at The Oval. In the summer of 1989, Kee signed with Crusaders in his final season.

He later moved into management, enjoying stints with Institute and Carlisle, and managed the IFA under-17s, as well as County Performance Coach in Tyrone for the Irish Football Association

Since moving into coaching and management in 1988, Kee has amassed coaching knowledge that he now uses in his varied roles as County Performance Coach, Northern Ireland U18 manager and Director of Maiden City Soccer Academy in Derry.

He currently hold a U.E.F.A. Pro licence and is Director of Maiden City Soccer in Derry. An organisation which has been involved in the development of such players as Darron Gibson (Everton) Shane Ferguson (Newcastle United) and Eunan O'Kane (AFC Bournemouth)

== Career honours ==
=== As a player ===
==== Coleraine ====
Winner

- Irish League Cup 1987

=== As a manager ===
- 2013-14 NIFL Championship winner with Institute.
- Northern Ireland Sportswriters 'Guinness' 1st Division Manager of the Year 2002
- Promotion to Daily Mirror Premier League with Institute F.C. 2002 – Runners up to Lisburn Distillery
- Craig Memorial Cup Winners 1999— Institute v Moyola Park at Limavady Showground's
- North West Senior Cup Winners 1998—Institute v Limavady United at Limavady Showground's
- Smirnoff Cup Winners 1997—Institute v Chimney Corner at Limavady Showground's
- McEwen's Lager Soccer Sixes Winners 1994—Omagh Town v Glenavon at Dundonald Ice Bowl
- Tyrone Cup Winner 1993—Omagh Town v Dungannon Swifts at Stangmore Park
- Budweiser Cup Winners 1991—Omagh Town v Linfield at The Oval Belfast
