= Lurgan Celtic F.C. =

Association football club in Northern Ireland

Lurgan Celtic
- Full name: Lurgan Celtic Football Club
- Nicknames: Lurgan Hoops; Celtic; Wee Hoops; Lurgan Bhoys
- Founded: Est. 1903, 1969
- Ground: Lord Lurgan Park (Allenhill Park) & Banbridge High 4g
- Manager: Niall Lavery
- League: Mid-Ulster Football League Intermediate B Division
- 2025/26: Mid-Ulster Football League Division 1 / Finished 2nd of 12
Home colours	Away colours

Lurgan Celtic Football Club is a intermediate-level football club based in Lurgan, County Armagh, that plays in the Mid-Ulster Football League Intermediate B Division. The club was founded in 1903 and reformed in 1969 as the recognised spiritual successor (acknowledged within the club's crest). The club plays in a strip based on the Scottish team Celtic F.C., although it began with green and white candy-striped shirts. Lurgan Celtic forms part of the Mid-Ulster Football Association.

In August 2019, Lurgan Celtic announced that its senior side would withdraw from the NIFL and "implement a new youth academy structure" and "restructure its youth academy", with a view to restarting its senior teams for the 2020–21 season. Lurgan Celtic resumed senior football activities at the bottom of the Mid-Ulster Football League pyramid, upon the commencement of the 2020–21 season. After the resumption of Mid-Ulster Football League, after the outbreak of the Covid-19 pandemic, the club made a return to the senior/mens Football League calendar for the 2021–2022 season. The club garnered promotions up the senior pyramid, and back into Intermediate football for the 2026–27 season.

== History ==
A club by the name of Lurgan Celtic was originally formed in 1903, with its name slanting towards the Roman Catholic community of Lurgan, adopting the name and colours of Glasgow Celtic, a popular club among the Irish Catholics population of Glasgow and the west of Scotland.The Gaelic Athletic Association was in its early stages and was keen to promote Gaelic games and association football in particular, perceived as "foreign", was discouraged. A change in attitudes gradually took hold in the early 1970s and Lurgan Celtic was reborn, subsequently rising to become one of the strongest clubs in the Craigavon area. The club won several honours in Mid-Ulster Football league and cup competitions in the 1970s–1990s.

Irish Football League membership remained elusive during these years, partly due to the presence of Glenavon down the road at a time when the IFA was trying to reach out to new footballing towns. There was also a suggestion that it was the club's nationalist stance as they pushed for membership of what was considered a predominantly Unionist league that stood in their way. So strongly was this felt that the club joined forces with Belfast club Donegal Celtic, another club that took its name and kit from the Glasgow club, and threatened the league with legal action to gain membership.The restructuring of the league in the early part of the 21st century eventually resulted in both Celtic clubs gaining admission to the Irish Football League Second Division for the 2002–03 season.

In 2007, the club closed their town centre ground Grattan Park and relocated to share Oxford United's ground on the edge of Lurgan at Knockramer Park, which offered better facilities.

Promotion to the Intermediate League First Division was achieved in 2006–07, but in 2008 the club failed to meet the criteria for a place in the new IFA Championship, and found itself in the IFA Interim League for the 2008–09 season. They made the necessary improvements to gain admission to the newly formed third tier, IFA Championship 2, for the 2009–10 season. After seven seasons of consolidation in Championship 2 with the occasional risk of relegation, Celtic rose to the 2014–15 NIFL Championship 2 title, achieving promotion to the national second tier, Championship 1.

On the back of their title success the previous season, Celtic reached the quarter-finals for the first time ever in the 2015–16 Irish Cup. The club were drawn to face senior NIFL Premiership side and beaten Irish Cup finalists the previous year, Portadown away at Shamrock Park. Celtic stunned Portadown by taking a 2–0 lead after 54 minutes.However, Portadown came back into the match after 70 minutes with two goals of their own to level the score at 2–2. However, Lurgan Celtic had the last say, and scored a last-minute penalty to win 3–2 and cause a major upset by eliminating Portadown, and reaching the semi-finals of the cup for the first time in the club's history. The match was Portadown's final match under the management of Ronnie McFall. After the match, the Portadown manager resigned, ending his reign at the club after 29 years. In the Irish Cup semi-final they were defeated 3–0 by Linfield with Aaron Burns scoring a hat-trick.

Despite the achievement of reaching the Irish-Cup semi-finals, manager Colin Malone resigned at the end of the 2016-17 season and the club endured a period of instability. The appointment of Brendan Shannon as Celtic player-manager could not prevent a downturn in results, and Shannon left halfway through the 2017-18 season, to be succeeded by Frankie Wilson. By this point, relegation to the third tier had become an inevitability; Celtic finished the season 20 points adrift of 11th-placed Dergview.

Life in the NIFL Premier Intermediate League started with another managerial change, with former Glenavon, Spurs and Northern Ireland winger Gerard McMahon taking the reins at Knockramer Park. This, however, failed to stem the club's decline, as they finished second-bottom of the division, on 19 points.

A 17-year spell in the Northern Ireland Football League ended on 15 August 2019, as the club announced its intention to withdraw from the Premier Intermediate League, with a view to reforming youth structures and resuming senior football activities for the 2020–21 season. It was announced on 29 June 2020 that Lurgan Celtic's application to join the Mid-Ulster Football League was accepted, and the club was due to play in the MUFL Junior Division 3 for the 2020–21 season.

After returning to senior football, the Mid-Ulster Football League was suspended until 2021–2022 season due to the outbreak of the Covid-19 pandemic.

Lurgan Celtic gained successive promotions following re-commencement from Mid-Ulster Football League Division 3 where the club had gotten themselves promoted up two divisions higher and into MUFL Division 1 for 2023–24 season. During those spells in Mid-Ulster Football League Junior divisions, they won two cup competitions, the John Magee Memorial Cup & the Gerald Kennedy Cup, losing one other final, being the Mid-Ulster Football League Forster Cup. After a period of two seasons played in MUFL Division 1, the club subsequently gained promotion back into Intermediate football. Lurgan Celtic is due to join the Mid-Ulster Football League Intermediate B division for the 2026–27 season.

== Honours ==
- NIFL Championship 2 (tier 3) (1): 2014–15
- Mid-Ulster Football League (2): 1922–23†, 1997–98
- Northern Ireland Intermediate League (1): 2000–01
- Bob Radcliffe Cup (2): 1997–98, 2011–12
- Irish Junior Cup (1): 1990–91
- Mid-Ulster Cup (3): 1911–12, 1912–13, 1914–15†
- Mid-Ulster Division 1 (2): 2005–06, 2006–07^
- Mid-Ulster Shield (1): 1971–72

† Lurgan Celtic pre-1969
^ Reserves team
