= Dollingstown F.C. =

Association football club in Northern Ireland

Coordinates: 54°26′51.9″N 6°16′42″W

Dollingstown
- Full name: Dollingstown Football Club
- Nickname: The Dollybirds
- Founded: 1979
- Ground: Planters Park; Dollingstown, County Down
- Capacity: 750
- Manager: Stephen Uprichard
- League: NCL Premier
- 2025–26: NIFL Premier Intermediate League, 5th of 14
Home colours

Dollingstown Football Club, referred to as Dollingstown, or by their nickname "The Dollybirds", is an intermediate-level football club from Dollingstown, County Down, Northern Ireland. The club currently competes in the NCL Premier and their home ground is Planters Park in Dollingstown, which has a capacity of approximately 750 people. The manager of the club is Stephen Uprichard and the club was founded in 1979 by local football fans. Dollingstown are a part of the Mid-Ulster Football Association.

With the club's founding, the club applied to join the Mid-Ulster Football League and were accepted into Division 5. Dollingstown won their first trophy, the John Magee Cup, in the 1992/93 season under the management of Colin McCullough. In the 2010–11 season, the club was denied promotion to the IFA Championship 2 for playing an ineligible player in eight league matches. The club lost the points gained through these games, and appealed the decision in court, however it was dismissed.

In 2019, the club marked their 40th anniversary.

== History ==
=== Early years ===
Dollingstown was founded in 1979 by a group of locals who met up every couple of days to play football. The club's first home ground was at the Railway Tavern in Moira. The club gained their first sponsor, EPH Car Sales, who sponsored their first kit. With the club's founding, the club applied to join the Mid-Ulster Football League and were accepted into Division 5. During the club's early years, Dollingstown played in Division 5 for four seasons. The club was then promoted into Division 4 and then Division 3. During this period, the club's home grounds were in Monbrief, Craigavon. Dollingstown later relocated their home grounds onto the Gorden Playing Fields in Lurgan, slowly working their way back to their roots in the Dollingstown area. Dollingstown won their first trophy, the John Magee Cup, in the 1992–93 season under the management of Colin McCullough.

=== Further promotions ===
For the 1998–99 season, the club committee asked Hubert Watson to come on board as Dollingstown's managers. In the 1999–00 season, Watson's second full season, Dollingstown won Division 3 and gained promotion into Division 2. The club remained in Division 2 for several seasons before gaining promotion into Division 1.

In the 2013–14 season, the club secured promotion to the NIFL Championship after winning a play-off against Brantwood. After losing the first leg 2–1 at Skegoneill Avenue, Dollingstown won the second leg 5–2 at Planters Park to ensure a 6–4 victory on aggregate. As a result, they were promoted to NIFL Championship 2 in place of Killymoon Rangers, who had finished bottom of Championship 2. In 2016 the club was relegated from the Northern Ireland Football League but as of 2017–18 season was promoted back into the league after winning Intermediate A at a canter.

=== Dispute with the Irish Football Association ===
In the 2010–11 season, Dollingstown was denied promotion into the IFA Championship 2 for allowing an ineligible player, Ashley Gregg, to play in eight league matches. Consequently, they lost all the points they had obtained in the matches the player took part in, and finished in 4th place instead of 1st. In response, the decision was appealed by the club. The club ended up taking their case to the High Court. However, it was dismissed. If Dollingstown had won their case, they would have been promoted, which would have led to Chimney Corner being relegated. In the end, Tandragee Rovers were crowned champions of the division but did not apply for entry to the Championship. Hubert Watson expressed his opinion on the incident: “I feel absolutely disgusted with the administration of football in Northern Ireland. Dollingstown were transparent in everything we have done, and yet we are the ones being punished. The judge has decided, so it's the end of the road for us in this. We'll be in the Mid Ulster League this season."

In the 2012–13 season, they narrowly missed out on a place in Championship 2 again. After winning the league title, they faced Northern Amateur Football League champions Newington in a two-legged play-off for promotion, and lost the tie on the away goals rule after it finished 4–4 on aggregate. A 3–2 home win followed by a 2–1 away defeat was not enough, and Newington were promoted at Dollingstown's expense.

=== Promotion ===
In the 2013–14 season, the club secured promotion to the NIFL Championship after winning a play-off against Brantwood. After losing the first leg 2–1 at Skegoneill Avenue, Dollingstown won the second leg 5–2 at Planters Park to ensure a 6–4 victory on aggregate. As a result, they were promoted to NIFL Championship 2 in place of Killymoon Rangers, who had finished bottom of Championship 2. In 2016 the club was relegated from the Northern Ireland Football League but as of 2017–18 season was promoted back into the league after winning Intermediate A at a canter.

=== 40th Anniversary ===
In 2019, Dollingstown celebrated the 40th Anniversary of the club's founding. The club also celebrated the anniversary by holding a "Current vs Oldies" football game, which took place on New Years 2019.

== Sponsorship ==
Dollingstown has a number of sponsors including main sponsor Huhtamäki.

== Managerial history ==
=== Team managers ===
Dollingstown F.C.'s first manager was Colin McCullough; Dollingstown won their first trophy, the John Magee Cup, under his management. From 1999 to 2006, Dollingstown became under the management of Hubert Watson. In 2006, Gary Duke took over as Manager of the club. After 10 years, Duke resigned in 2016. He was then succeeded by Stephen Uprichard, the current manager of the club.

=== Reserve team managers ===
Brian Gregson was the Reserve Team Manager in 2010. Timmy Lenon then took over the role of Reserve Team Manager until 2011. He was followed by Graeme Hynds (2011–2013), Simon Brown (2013–2015), Brian King (2015–2016), David Harvey & Colin Martin (2016–2017), Craig Willsher (2017), Daniel Bennett (2017–2018, Interim), Aron Ewins & Gary Morrow (2017–2018, Interim), Simon Brown (2018–2020), Alan Murdough (2020–2021) and Steven Park. As of March 2023, Steven Park has been the Reserve Team Manager for two years, since 2021.

== First team squad ==
Note: Flags indicate national team as defined under FIFA eligibility rules; some limited exceptions apply. Players may hold more than one non-FIFA nationality.

No.	Pos.	Nation	Player
1	GK	NIR	Gareth Buchanan
3	MF	NIR	Daniel Neill
4	MF	NIR	Nathan McConnell
5	DF	NIR	Aaron Sharkey
6	DF	NIR	Jordan Campbell
7	MF	NIR	Daniel Gordon
8	DF	NIR	Ben Neill
9	FW	NIR	Gary Liggett
11	FW	NIR	Chris Lavery
12	DF	NIR	Sean Toman

No.	Pos.	Nation	Player
13	GK	NIR	Stephen Croft
14	MF	NIR	James Sergeant
16	DF	NIR	Scott Megaw
20	MF	NIR	Jackson Holmes
21	DF	NIR	Oran O'Kane
22	FW	NIR	Aaron Duke
30	DF	NIR	Owen McConville
34	FW	NIR	Joe Williamson
46	DF	NIR	Harry Norton (on loan from Glenavon)

== Club honours ==
- Irish Intermediate Cup: 1
  - 2019–20
- Bob Radcliffe Cup: 3
  - 2016–17, 2021–22, 2024-25
- Mid-Ulster Football League: 5
  - 2008–09, 2012–13, 2013–14, 2016–17, 2017–18
- Mid Ulster Football League Division Three: 5
  - 1999–00, 2012–13, 2013–14, 2016–17, 2017–18
- Marshall Cup: 5
  - 2008–09, 2011–12, 2012–13, 2013–14, 2017–18
- Premier Cup: 2
  - 2009–10, 2013–14
- John Magee Cup: 1
  - 1992–93
- Reserve Division Two: 1
  - 2008–09
- Wilmor Johnston Memorial Cup: 2
  - 2014–15, 2018–19
- O'Hara Cup: 1
  - 2013–14
