= Riverside Stadium, Drumahoe =

Sport venue in Drumahoe, Northern Ireland

Coordinates: 54°58′34″N 7°16′42″W

Riverside Stadium
- Riverside
- Interactive map of Riverside Stadium
- Capacity: 3,110 (1,540 seated)

Construction
- Built: 1980
- Opened: 1980
- Closed: 2017

Tenant
- Institute F.C.

Riverside Stadium, formerly the YMCA Grounds, was a football stadium in Drumahoe, County Londonderry, Northern Ireland. It is the former home ground of Institute F.C. of the NIFL Championship. The stadium held 3,000 people with 1,540 seated. It was opened in the 1980s but has been abandoned and closed since 2017 following the flooding of the ground.

== History ==
In 1980, a site at Drumahoe was purchased jointly by the Presbyterian Working Men's Institute (of which Institute was the football team) and the Londonderry YMCA with Institute being granted an initial 25 year lease. The new football grounds were not opened officially until January 1985, but Institute had been playing at the YMCA Grounds since 1980. When it was opened, it was considered as being just a pitch with a rope around it.

The development of a stadium began in 1995 when the club established a committee to plan its development with a view to gaining entry to the Irish League B Division, the top level of intermediate football. The ground was enclosed by a new security fence, and new changing rooms, toilets, facilities for disabled fans, rooms for hospitality and a shop, and two new turnstiles were added and admission to the B Division was achieved in 1996. A second phase of development resulted in the erection of a new 300-seater stand and floodlights. This was enough to gain senior status with admission to the Irish League First Division in 1999.

In May 2008, the club secured £800,000 worth of funding for improvements to the ground. In May 2009, the club installed new floodlights at each corner of the ground, and in November 2010, more ground development began, involving the building of a new 800-seater stand at one of the goal-mouths. This work was completed in August 2011.

== Flooding and closure ==
Severe flooding through the North-West of Northern Ireland on the evening of 22 August 2017 led to the River Faughan bursting its banks and destroyed the pitch, with water reaching as high as 7 foot inside changing rooms and with 5 foot of sediment piled on top of what was left of the playing surface (which would later develop Japanese Knotweed). The perimeter fence was ripped out and nearby trees were uprooted, some of which were washed onto the pitch.

This resulted in the closure of the stadium and Institute's relocation to their current temporary home of the Ryan McBride Brandywell Stadium. Due to the flooding, it was noted that it would be difficult for Institute to get flood insurance for the stadium in the future. In 2022, Institute were granted planning permission to demolish the stadium and return it to a greenfield site. They stated they would be looking to replace the Riverside Stadium with a new ground in Waterside.
