= Institute F.C. =

Association football club in Northern Ireland

Institute
- Full name: Institute Football Club
- Nicknames: Stute, The Sky Blues
- Founded: 1905
- Ground: Ryan McBride Brandywell Stadium (temporary)
- Capacity: 3,700 (2,900 seated)
- Chairman: Bill Anderson
- Manager: Peter Hutton
- League: NIFL Championship
- 2025–26: NIFL Championship, 7th of 12
- Website: www.institutefc.co.uk
Home colours	Away colours

Institute Football Club is a Northern Irish semi-professional association football club playing in the NIFL Championship. The club, founded in 1905, currently play their home matches at the Ryan McBride Brandywell Stadium, Derry. Club colours are sky blue and maroon. The club is managed by Peter Hutton.

== History ==
=== Early years (1905–1912) ===
The Presbyterian Working Men's Institute founded in 1882 was associated with football as early as 1893, when the North-End Football Club was founded. That club ceased to exist in 1904 and in October 1905, a number of players and supporters of North End Olympic F.C., the junior team of the late club which had folded, conceived the idea of creating a new football team. A meeting was accordingly held in the rooms of the Diamond Hotel, with the late Mr. William Buchanan, acting as chairman. It was thereupon decided to form a Junior football club known as Institute F.C. affiliated with the North West Football Association and to play only friendly matches during the 1905–06 season.

The club played their first ever match (a friendly) against St Columbs Court at Magee College grounds (which the club used as their home pitch for that season), winning the match 2–1. Those who played in this match were: J. Parkhill, D. Patton, Wm. Neely, R.A. Bogle, W. M. Wilton, D. Gillespie, J. Holland, D. McCleery, D. Gilfillan, G. Young, and A. Doherty. Institute arranged many other friendlies during that season and continued to grow in strength.

In the 1906–07 season the club entered the North-West Junior League. Their first ever junior match was a league match away to Farm Wanderers which ended in a 4–4 draw. In the season of 1907–08, Billy Gillespie began playing for the club, and went on to become one of the club's greatest ever players. The club won the North-West Charity Cup that season, beating Derry Celtic Wanderers 4–1 in the final, making them the first Junior team ever to win the trophy. Mr William Logue became chairman of the club and remained chairman until the year 1914.

In the 1910–11 season, although the team lost Billy Gillespie to Leeds City, they managed to reach the semi-final of the Irish Junior Cup, in which they were defeated 2–1 by Broadway United at the Brandywell. The 1911–12 season saw the club reach the final of the Irish Junior Cup, narrowly losing out on winning the trophy after a 2–1 defeat by Brantwood at Grosvenor Park, Belfast.

=== Intermediate years (1981–1999) ===
In 1981 Institute joined the Intermediate League. Their first season in the Intermediate league (the 1981–82 season) turned out to be the club's most successful ever in the league. Their first ever intermediate match was a league match against Roe Valley, which they won 8–1. That season they also reached the semi-finals of the Intermediate Cup, where they beat RUC on penalties at the Coleraine Showgrounds, meaning they had earned themselves a place in the first round of the Irish Cup.

They met Chimney Corner in the final, but were beaten 2–0 in an unconvincing performance. Their Irish Cup first round match against Coleraine also ended in defeat, Coleraine winning 2–1.

In 1996, Institute entered the Irish League B Division for the 1996–97 season. They also won the Smirnoff Cup that season, beating Chimney Corner 4–2 in the final. They finished 7th in the league. In the 1998–99 season the club gained promotion to the Irish First Division.

=== Senior football, promotions and relegations (1999–2010) ===
On 14 August 1999, the club played their first ever match as a senior football team. The match was at home to Bangor in the Irish League First Division and the result was a 3–3 draw which saw Institute come from behind. The first victory of that season was a 1–0 win away to local North-West rivals Limavady United. A visit from Armagh City at the end of the season saw a massive 7–0 victory for Institute, with top scorer Roddy McDowell going down in the record books for scoring the club's first ever senior hat-trick (he actually scored four on the day). Institute ended the season in 6th place.

In the 2000–01 season the club finished in the top half of the league, securing 5th place. The following season, the club finished in 2nd place in the First Division, securing promotion to the Irish Premier League. That season saw four players reach 100 appearances for the club, these were Graeme Philson, Adrian Creane, Ryan Coyle and John McGarvey.

The first match of the 2002–03 season was away to Glentoran, which was lost 4–1. That season also spelt the end of Paul Kee's 3-year reign as manager, as he left to manage Carlisle United. Despite this, the club won the North-West cup, and finished in 6th place in the league (top half), which is still the club's highest ever league placing. In the 2003–04 season, the club finished in 11th place in the league, but the 2004–05 season was a slightly more successful one for the club, with a 9th-place finish in the table.

Institute were relegated from the Premier division at the end of the 2005–06 season, after losing out in the promotion/relegation play-off against Donegal Celtic, played due to the club finishing 15th out of 16 in the Premier Division, and Donegal Celtic finishing 2nd in the First Division. The club lost the first leg 3–1 away from home and played out a 0–0 draw in the second leg at home.

In 2006–07, they were winners of the First Division, gaining promotion back to the top flight after only one season. In the 2007–08 season the club managed to avoid relegation, finishing 14th. The following season they finished in 7th place out of 12 clubs (after the league had been reduced from 16 clubs to 12 from the 2008–09 season onwards) and reached the semi-final of the Irish Cup for the first time.

The following season, after finishing last (12th) place in the Premiership, a promotion/relegation play-off – again against Donegal Celtic – would decide whether or not the club would be relegated. They narrowly lost out in this play-off, drawing 0–0 in the first leg away from home, and then losing 1–0 at home to an 85th-minute winner from Donegal Celtic's Stephen McAlorum. This meant relegation to IFA Championship 1.

=== Return of Paul Kee, promotions and relegations (2010–present) ===
2010–11 season was the club's first season return in the second tier in 4 years, and saw Paul Kee return to the club, after being appointed as Head of Development near to the end of the season. The club brought home the North West Senior Cup after beating Coleraine 3–1 in the final, and finished in 8th place in the league, having won 6 out of their last 8 league games to ease any relegation fears that there had been before this run of form.

In the 2011–12 season, the club completed a cup double having won the North West Senior Cup for the second successive season, once again beating Coleraine in the final. The result was 4–2 and the match was played at the Riverside Stadium. This was accompanied by success in the Craig Memorial Cup, lifting the trophy after beating Tobermore United in a penalty shoot-out, when the match ended in a stalemate 1–1 result at Fortwilliam Park. The club finished in 3rd place in Championship 1.

The 2012–13 season included the appointment of Paul Kee as manager and a North West Senior Cup final defeat to Coleraine; 3–0 at the Coleraine Showgrounds. The club finished 3rd in Championship 1 for the second successive season, missing out on the promotion play-off place, finishing 3 points behind league runners-up Warrenpoint Town. The club lifted the Irish Intermediate Cup for the first ever time after defeating Ards Rangers 1–0 in the final with a late winner from Darren McFadden.

Once again the club were promoted to the top tier after being crowned champions of NIFL Championship 1 on the final day of the season, with a 1–1 draw against Harland & Wolff Welders for Bangor meaning the 2–0 win in the North-West derby at home to Limavady United was enough to see the club finish top of the pile for the second time. A successful season, despite an Intermediate Cup semi-final defeat to Armagh City and including another North-West Senior Cup final appearance – ending in a defeat in a penalty shoot-out to Newbuildings United – was enjoyed by the club. A 2014–2015 NIFL Premiership season in which the club were relegated once more after a 12th (bottom) placed finish, also saw a North-West Senior Cup triumph, beating Moyola Park 3–1 in the final at the Riverside Stadium in October 2014. The season's end also marked the end of Paul Kee's second 4-year stint in charge after being relieved of his duties in April 2015; as well as the resignations of several board members such as chairman Keith McElhinney and vice-chairman Trevor Hewitt.

Kevin Deery was appointed as manager in late May 2015 with former Institute captain Paddy McLaughlin as his new assistant. In the first season under the new management, Institute finished in 6th place in the league but still qualified for the NIFL Premiership promotion/relegation play-off (due to all of the above teams in 2nd–5th place not acquiring a promotion license) in which they lost out 5–4 on aggregate to an injury time winning goal from Ballinamallard United to level the second leg at 3–3. Also knocked out of the league cup at the quarter-final stage in a 2–1 defeat to Warrenpoint Town; as well as a 2–1 Craig Memorial Cup final defeat to rivals Limavady United, the club managed to get success in the Irish Intermediate Cup, defeating league champions Ards 3–1 in the final.

There was a taste of success via the North West Senior Cup in the 2016–17 season, beating Coleraine in the final (1–1 full-time, 4–2 on penalties), however a 5–2 aggregate loss to Carrick Rangers in the NIFL Premiership promotion/relegation play-off final (having beaten Ballyclare Comrades 3–2 on aggregate in the semi-final), coupled with first and sixth round exits from the League Cup and Irish Cup respectively meant it made for a frustrating season overall. Manager Kevin Deery handed in his resignation following the season end, on 20 May 2017, following discussions with chairman Bill Anderson and was replaced by his assistant, and former club captain, Paddy McLaughlin, on 24 May 2017.

In the 2017–18 season, the club won the NIFL Championship and gained promotion to the NIFL Premiership once more. They retained the North West Senior Cup with a 3–1 final victory over Coleraine at the Coleraine Showgrounds, but suffered defeats in the last 16 of both the NIFL League Cup and Irish Cup, in what was seen as a fantastic season for the club considering the flooding of their Riverside Stadium home after just one home league game.

The 2018–19 season saw the club finish eighth place in the NIFL Premiership, as well as the departure of manager Paddy McLaughlin, (in February 2019), who left to take the Cliftonville job. The club appointed first team coach Kevin Doherty as caretaker manager until the end of the season, at which point, new manager John Quigg was appointed, on 22 April 2019.

Following the resignation of John Quigg on 3 August 2019 after just two matches in charge; Sean Connor was appointed as first team manager a month later, on 14 September, with the club yet to win a game in the 2019–20 season. In a season which was severely impacted by the COVID-19 pandemic, Institute were relegated following an NIFL decision to go ahead with promotion and relegation, despite the curtailment of the season with 7 matches remaining. The club appealed the decision to no avail; having been bottom of the table, but just 3 points adrift of 11th-placed Warrenpoint Town. Prior to the pandemic, Institute had reached the NIFL League Cup semi-final for the first time in the history of the club, where a 2–0 defeat to Crusaders was the result.

Following a season without football below NIFL Premiership level in Northern Ireland, due to the pandemic; the club returned to playing competitively - now in the NIFL Championship - at the beginning of the 2021–22 season. Three heavy defeats to start the season saw the reign of Sean Connor come to an end on 17 August 2021, with former first team coach and assistant manager; Brian Donaghey appointed as the new manager days later, on 25 August. The season ended with Institute placed 9th, after a disappointing campaign which saw them exit the Irish Cup (to intermediate club Portstewart) and League Cup (due to fielding an ineligible player vs PSNI) both at the earliest hurdle and the North West Senior Cup after a 2-1 semi-final defeat to Ballinamallard United.

The 2022–23 season saw the resignation of manager, Brian Donaghey in April 2023, one game before the season's end, where the club finished 11th place in the Championship after a run of just 2 wins from their last 21 matches. Eddie Seydak oversaw the final league match as caretaker manager before Kevin Deery returned as manager in June 2023. Deery's first season on his return (2023-24), saw a second-placed finish for Institute and a 2-1 aggregate loss to Ballymena United in what was a third NIFL Premiership promotion/relegation play-off with the club, for the manager. The club also suffered a North West Senior Cup final penalty shootout loss to North-West rivals Limavady United and exited the 2023-24 Irish Cup in the quarter-finals.

== Stadium ==
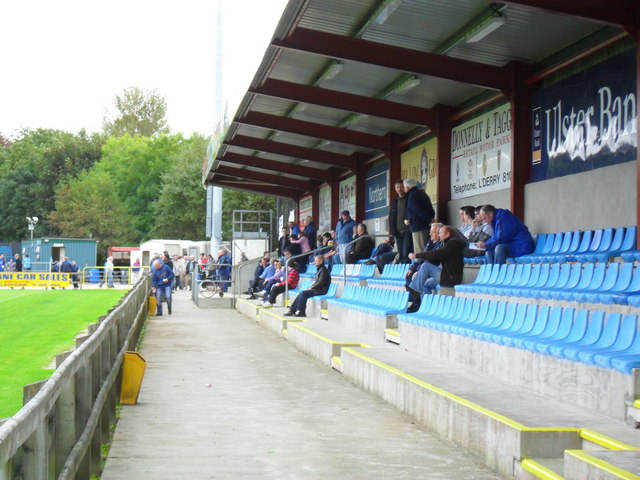
The Billy Kee Stand, Drumahoe - geograph.org.uk - 1508301

The club's former home was Riverside Stadium located in Drumahoe, Derry and had a total capacity of 3,110 people with 1,540 seated.

In 1995 it was decided that the club would make plans to develop the ground to meet IFA regulation standard, to gain entry to the Irish League. Plans included new toilet facilities, new changing rooms, facilities for the disabled, purchasing two porter-cabins to use as a club shop and for hospitality, a new security fence to enclose the ground and two new turnstiles resulting in the club's entry to the B Division of the Irish League.

In 1998 the club decided to build a 330-seater stand at the south side of the ground. The stand was named 'The Billy Kee Stand' after their great player. In May 2011, 110 extra seats were added to the Billy Kee stand taking the number of seats to 440. The seats in this stand are blue, yellow, white and black. This stand is allocated to the home fans on match days.

Next they built a 200-seater stand at the north side of the ground. An extra row of 100 seats were added to the stand in May 2011, increasing its capacity to 300 seats. The seats in the stand are blue, yellow, white and black. This is simply known as the 'North Stand' and is allocated to away fans on a match day.

2008 saw the club build a terraced stand. The stand was named 'The Billy Henderson Stand' after the club's main sponsor. Both home and away fans can stand here on a match day. The two sets of fans are divided/segregated by a metal gate in the stand. The away section of the stand is slightly larger than the home section.

In November 2010 the building of a new 800-seater stand at the east end of the ground began and was fully completed in August 2011. The building of the stand was the main part of a £956,000 project to both increase the capacity (for safety) and also improve the overall facilities at the ground. The major funder of the project was Sport NI with the remainder of the funding coming from the IFA and Derry City Council. The stand also contains extensive toilet facilities and a shop at the back of it, these facilities can be accessed by walking through the tunnel which was built into the middle of the stand.

In 2008, the club improved disabled access at the ground and provided a public address system, additional toilets and emergency lighting. In May 2009 the club installed new floodlights at each corner of the ground. In 2011 – included as part of the project in the building of the East Stand and the increased capacity of the Billy Kee and North stands – additional facilities were added to the ground, including both home and away turnstiles, a control room, CCTV, a media suite, a viewing area at the top of the East Stand, a disabled access lift to the viewing area and various upgrades in the security fencing surrounding the ground.

In December 2015, club chairman Bill Anderson spoke in local newspaper Londonderry Sentinel, about plans for a 4G playing surface within the ground, and asked for the backing of the club's supporters and local councillors with the matter of acquiring the appropriate funding required from Northern Irish football's governing bodies in order for the plans to proceed.

=== Flooding and stadium closure ===
Severe flooding through the North-West of Northern Ireland on the evening of 22 August 2017 devastated the club when the ground was destroyed by water reaching as high as 7-foot inside changing rooms and with 5-foot of sediment piled on top of what was left of the playing surface (which would later develop Japanese knotweed). The perimeter fence was ripped out and nearby trees were uprooted, some of which were washed onto the pitch.

This meant that the club would have to relocate, at least temporarily, to Wilton Park, home of North-West Junior League club Churchill United, in an agreement to share their ground, for at least the remainder of the season.

Following promotion to the NIFL Premiership, the club entered a ground sharing agreement with Derry City and the Derry City and Strabane District Council for the use of Brandywell Stadium the 2018–19 season as a temporary fix, for a ground capable of meeting the requirements set by the NIFL for a club competing in the top tier.

This agreement was continued into the 2019–20 season and a 5-year plan was put forward by the club, with an aim to relocate to a new purpose-built stadium in the Clooney Park West site, of Derry's Waterside area.

In January 2022, the club applied to have the Riverside Stadium demolished. Planning permission was approved in June 2022, with the intention of returning the land to a greenfield site.

=== Proposed new stadium ===
In 2019, a 5-year plan was put forward by the club, with the aim to relocate to a new purpose-built stadium in the Clooney Park West site, of Derry's Waterside area.

In July 2022, chairman Bill Anderson stated that the club aim to get their plans approved by the council and begin plans for moving into a new stadium within 3 seasons.

In January 2023, plans to reuse and repurpose much of the structure of the Riverside Stadium in the new-build stadium were made clear. With some of the bricks, mortar, old seats and stands to be repurposed.

The club were confirmed as the council's preferred tenants for the Clooney Park West site in February 2023.

== Current squad ==
As of 1 March 2026

Note: Flags indicate national team as defined under FIFA eligibility rules; some limited exceptions apply. Players may hold more than one non-FIFA nationality.

No.	Pos.	Nation	Player
1	GK	NIR	Jack Mills
2	DF	IRL	Shea McGinley
3	DF	NIR	Conor Quigley
4	DF	NIR	Shane Boyle
5	DF	NIR	Graham Crown
6	MF	IRL	Evan Tweed
7	DF	NIR	Caoimhin Porter
8	MF	IRL	Stephen Doherty
9	FW	NIR	Padraig Lynch
10	MF	NIR	Brendan Barr

No.	Pos.	Nation	Player
15	DF	NIR	Caoimhan Crossan
18	FW	IRL	Benny McLaughlin
20	FW	NIR	Ciaran O'Hara
23	DF	IRL	Sean O'Kane
25	MF	NIR	Callum Deery
29	FW	NIR	Brian Russell
31	GK	NIR	Davy Stewart
35	FW	NIR	Cahir McMonagle
-	FW	NIR	Jack McLaughlin

== Managerial history ==
- Paul Hegarty (Player/manager) (2002–2005)
- Pascal Vaudequin (2005)
- Liam Beckett (2005–2008)
- John Gregg (2008–2011)
- Allan Blair (caretaker: 2011)
- Paul Carlyle (2011–2012)
- Paul Kee (1999–2002) (2012–2015)
- Paddy McLaughlin (2017–2019)
- Kevin Doherty (caretaker: 2019)
- John Quigg (2019)
- Sean Connor (2019–2021)
- Brian Donaghey (2021–2023)
- Eddie Seydak (caretaker: 2023)
- Kevin Deery (2015–2017) (2023-2025)
- Peter Hutton (2025-)

== Notable former players ==
- W.M. Wilton (1905–1907)
- Billy Gillespie (1907–1910)
- John Cunningham (1995–1996)
- Declan Devine (1998–2001)
- Tim Dalton (2001–2002)
- Mark McChrystal (on loan) (2003)
- Paul Hegarty (2002–2004) (Player/manager)
- Darron Gibson (youth career, 2003–2004)
- Ivan Sproule (2004–2005)
- Damien Whitehead (2005)
- Ciaran Greene (2006)
- Iarfhlaith Davoren (on loan) (2007)
- James McClean (2007)
- Neal Bartlett (2007)
- David Bell (2007–2008)
- Kyle Moran (2008)
- Ryan McBride (2007–2009)
- Philip Lowry (2007–2009)
- David Ogilby (2000–2010)
- Shaun Holmes (2009–2010)
- Tony Shields (2009–2010)
- Sean Friars (2009–2010) (2011–2012)
- Aaron McEneff (youth career, 2011–2013)
- Dean Jarvis (2011–13)
- Niall Logue (youth career, 2010–2014)
- Ryan Semple (1999–2005) (2007–2011) (2012–2014)
- Darren McCauley (on loan) (2012) (2012–2014)
- Stephen O'Flynn (2014–15)
- Saul Deeney (2015)
- Paddy McLaughlin (2005–2007) (2011–2015)
- Sam Morrow (youth career 1999–2001) (2017)
- John Connolly (2002–2004) (2005–2006) (2021–2022)
- Thomas McBride (2011–2012) (2014–2015) (2019) (2022–2023)
- BJ Banda (2024)
- Daniel Lafferty (2024)
- Cormac Burke (2014–2015) (2019–present)
- Mikhail Kennedy (2024–2025)

== Honours ==
=== Senior honours ===
- NIFL Championship: 1
  - 2017–18
- North West Senior Cup: 8
  - 1997–98, 2002–03, 2008–09, 2010–11, 2011–12, 2014–15, 2016–17, 2017–18
- North West Charity Cup: 1
  - 1906–07

=== Intermediate honours ===
- NIFL Championship: 2
  - 2006–07, 2013–14
- Irish Intermediate Cup: 2
  - 2012–13, 2015–16
- B Division Knock-out Cup/IFA Intermediate League Cup: 2
  - 1996–97, 2006–07
- Craig Memorial Cup: 2
  - 1998–99, 2011–12

=== Junior honours ===
- Irish Junior Cup: 1
  - 1968–69
- North West City Cup: 6
  - 1962–63, 1965–66, 1969–70, 1970–71, 1974–75, 1979–80
- North West League: 2
  - 1965–66, 1979–80
