= Drumahoe =

- village and townland
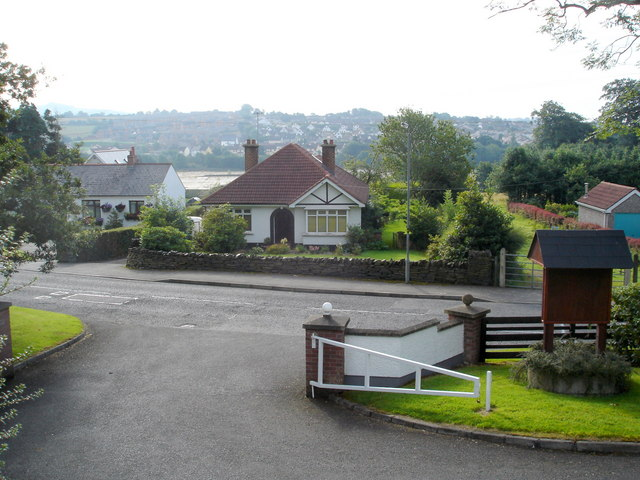

- Location within the United Kingdom
- Coordinates: 54°58′N 7°16′W

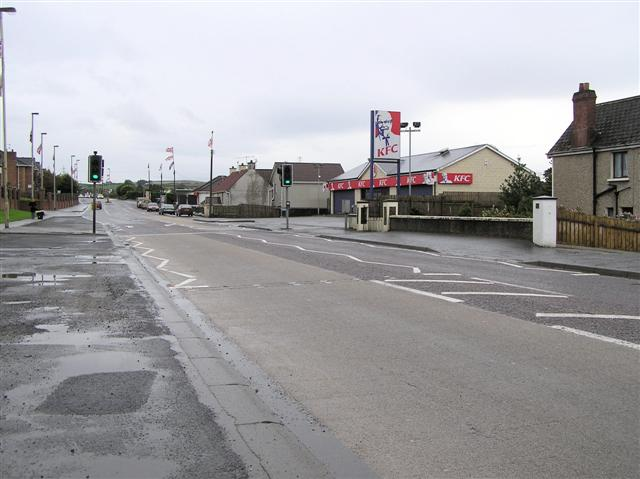
View of Drumahoe

Drumahoe (from Irish Droim na hUamha 'ridge of the cave') is a village and townland in County Londonderry, Northern Ireland. It lies to the east of Derry. It was home to Institute F.C., an NIFL Championship football club. The busy A6 road from Belfast to Derry passes through the townland. It is situated within Derry and Strabane district.

== Demography ==
On Census Day 29 April 2001 the resident population of Drumahoe was 1,367. Of these:

- 26.8% were under 16 years old and 11.2% were aged 60 and above
- 50.0% of the population were male and 50.0% were female
- 11.2% were from a Roman Catholic background and 85.7% were from a Protestant background
- 3.5% of those aged 16–74 were unemployed

== See also ==
- List of villages in Northern Ireland
