= PSNI F.C. =

Association football club in Northern Ireland

PSNI
- Full name: Police Service of Northern Ireland Football Club
- Nickname: PSNI F.C.
- Founded: 1928 (as RUC)
- Ground: Upper Malone, Belfast
- Capacity: 1,500
- Chairman: Ken Green
- Manager: Daniel Carlisle
- League: Mid-Ulster Football League Intermediate B
- 24-25: Mid-Ulster Football League Intermediate A, 14th of 14 (relegated)
Home colours	Away colours

PSNI Football Club is an intermediate Northern Irish football club that plays in the Mid-Ulster Football League Intermediate B division. The club is associated with the Police Service of Northern Ireland, and its home ground is Newforge Lane in Belfast.

== History ==
PSNI FC was founded in 1928 as RUC, derived from Royal Ulster Constabulary. Due to the connection with the police, prior to 2002, a number of teams with republican support would refuse to play matches against RUC. The club changed its name in 2002, following the police service's name change to the PSNI.

The club joined the Northern Amateur Football League in 1956 and became one of its leading clubs before being elevated to the Irish League B Division in 1975. The club stayed at this level until failing to gain a place in the reorganised and re-branded IFA Championship in 2008. They were relegated in 2020 on a points-per-game basis, due to the season being cut short due to the COVID-19 pandemic in Northern Ireland.

In April 2023, the club finished bottom of the NIFL Premier Intermediate League and was due to drop into amateur league football for the first time since 1973. However the club retained their league status in a new, 14-team PIL, due to issues with finding an appropriate league, and the issues with Warrenpoint Town. The move encored a great deal of criticism due to the move lacking sporting integrity, effectively meaning the club could not be relegated.

The club would finish bottom of the NIFL Premier Intermediate League and be successfully relegated this time, dropping out of senior football for the first time since 1973. They were placed in the Mid-Ulster Football League Intermediate A division. Due to their relegation, a proposed £30,000 grant offer from the Northern Irish Sports ministry was withdrawn as the funding was only eligible for IFA senior league clubs.

== Honours ==
Irish Football Association

- Irish League B Division
  - 1986–87
- Intermediate Cup
  - 1978–79, 1979–80, 1984–85, 1986–87
- Division Knock-out Cup
  - 1982–83, 1984–85, 1985–86.

County Antrim & District F.A.

- Steel & Sons Cup
  - 1993–94

Northern Amateur Football League

- Premier Division
  - 1970–71, 1972–73
- Clarence Cup
  - 1960–61
- Border Cup
  - 1964–65
