= Dergview F.C. =

Association football club in Northern Ireland

Coordinates: 54.703046°N 7.598176°W

Dergview
- Full name: Dergview Football Club
- Nickname: Constitution/The Constitutes
- Founded: 1980
- Ground: Darragh Park, Castlederg
- Capacity: 1,200
- Manager: Chris McDowell
- League: NCL Premier
- 2025–26: NIFL Premier Intermediate League, 9th of 14
Home colours	Away colours

Dergview Football Club is an intermediate-level, Northern Irish football playing in the NCL Premier.

== History ==
The club, founded in 1980, hails from Castlederg, County Tyrone, Northern Ireland, and plays its matches at Darragh Park. The club began in junior football, before working its way up to the senior level of Northern Irish football. The club traditionally play in black and white. They are nicknamed 'Constitution' or 'The Constitutes'.

Portadown legend Richard Clarke was appointed manager in June 2013. He resigned in February 2018.

After a difficult 2022/23 season, the club would see young defender Bobby Deane make the move to NIFL Premiership side Glenavon.

The clubs reserves won the Craig Stanfield IFA Junior Cup in 2023, defeating Harryville Homers 4–1 in the final at Windsor Park. Then former manager and Northern Ireland international Ivan Sproule would play and score in the game at the age of 42.

In 2023 the club appointed former Crusaders, Dungannon Swifts and Portadown defender Emmet Friars as manager following the departure of Tommy Canning.

Friars would depart the club in March 2024, with Ivan Sproule returning for a second spell in charge.

The club would be relegated from the NIFL Championship for the first time since 2010 following a play-off defeat to Armagh City on penalties.

== Current squad ==
Note: Flags indicate national team as defined under FIFA eligibility rules; some limited exceptions apply. Players may hold more than one non-FIFA nationality.

No.	Pos.	Nation	Player
1	GK	IRL	Dylan Doherty
2	DF	IRL	Dylan Aiken
3	MF	NIR	Garth Falconer
4	DF	IRL	Patrick Loughery
5	MF	IRL	Lee McLaughlin
6	MF	NIR	Blaine Burns (Captain)
7	FW	IRL	Marc Walsh
8	MF	IRL	Warner Ballantyne
9	FW	NIR	Stephen Curry
10	MF	IRL	Ronan McKinley

No.	Pos.	Nation	Player
11	FW	NIR	Paul Smith
12	GK	NIR	Tiernan McNamee
15	FW	NIR	Charlie McCrory
16	DF	NIR	Ryan McConnell
17	FW	NIR	Sean McDonagh
18	DF	IRL	Dale Maxwell
24	MF	NIR	Philip Wallace
25	DF	NIR	Shea Devlin
28	MF	IRL	Cathal Farren

== Honours ==
=== Senior honours ===
- North West Senior Cup: 2
  - 2020–21, 2021–22

=== Intermediate honours ===
- IFA Intermediate League Second Division: 1
  - 2007–08
- Fermanagh & Western Intermediate Cup: 1
  - 2009–10
- IFA Junior Cup: 1
  - 2022-23
