= Colin Nixon =

Northern Irish footballer & manager

Personal information
- Full name: Colin Lee Nixon
- Date of birth: 8 September 1978 (age 48)
- Place of birth: Newtownards, County Down, Northern Ireland
- Position: Right back

Senior career*
Years	Team	Apps	(Gls)
1995–2013	Glentoran	793	(88)
2013–2015	Bangor	28	(1)
2015	Larne	17	(4)
Total		838	(93)

International career
1999	Northern Ireland U21	1	(0)
2000–2007	Irish League XI	2	(0)

Managerial career
- 2016–2019: Ards
- Dundela
- * Club domestic league appearances and goals

Colin Nixon (born 8 September 1978) is a retired footballer from Northern Ireland who was the technical director of Glentoran Academy. Son of Alice and Hugh Nixon, Colin has a large football related family and has three children.

== Playing career ==
Nixon is the son of Hugh and Alice Nixon, and has five siblings and three children. Colin played for Glentoran for all of his professional career. He has mainly played at right back but can also play centre back. He is a Glentoran supporter, and a fan's favourite.

In August 2000, he joined Scottish side Livingston on trial. However nothing materialised from the trial.

'Nicky' is Glentoran's record appearance holder with over 700 appearances, the 700th coming in November 2010 against Portadown at Shamrock Park.

At the end of the 2012/13 Danske Bank Premiership season, Nixon was informed that he would not have his contract renewed. In his last game at The Oval, after making 792 appearances and scoring on 87 occasions - Nicky added one to each of those stats, replacing Jay Magee in the second half and scoring a spectacular acrobatic equaliser after 88 minutes to the delight of every fan in attendance. Nixon received a standing ovation before, during and after the game as the Glentoran fans paid tribute to a true club legend.

Colin Nixon came on for Glentoran in his final match, the 2013 Irish Cup Final which Glentoran won 3–1. He lifted the cup alongside goalkeeper Elliott Morris who was Glentoran Captain for the day.

== Managerial career ==
Nixon is no longer the manager of NIFL Premiership side Ards.

== Honours ==
Glentoran

- IFA Premiership (4): 1998–99, 2002–03, 2004–05, 2008–09
- Irish Cup (6): 1996, 1998, 2000, 2001, 2004 2013
- Irish League Cup (5): 2001, 2003, 2005, 2007, 2010
- Gold Cup (3): 1998–99, 1999–2000, 2000–01
- County Antrim Shield (7): 1999, 2000, 2001, 2002, 2003, 2008, 2011
