= Oran Kearney =

Northern Irish footballer and manager (born 1978)

Personal information
- Date of birth: 29 July 1978 (age 48)
- Place of birth: Ballymoney, Northern Ireland
- Position: Midfielder

Senior career*
Years	Team	Apps	(Gls)
- Moyola Park
2002–2005	Ballymena United	78	(23)
2005–2009	Linfield		

Managerial career
- 2009–2011: Limavady United
- 2011–2018: Coleraine
- 2018–2019: St Mirren
- 2019–2024: Coleraine
- 2025–: Ballymena United
- * Club domestic league appearances and goals

Oran Kearney (born 29 July 1978) is a Northern Irish professional football manager and former player who is the current manager of NIFL Premiership side Ballymena United.

== Playing career ==
Kearney joined Ballymena United from Moyola Park in 2002, after father-in-law Kenny Shiels became manager of the club.

In 2005, Kearney joined Linfield. On 30 April 2009, Kearney announced his retirement.

== Managerial career ==
In May 2009, Kearney was appointed manager of Limavady United. He then became manager of Coleraine in February 2011. Kearney guided Coleraine to win the Irish Cup in 2018 and second place in the NIFL Premiership in 2017–18. Kearney combined managing Coleraine with working as a PE teacher at the Cross and Passion College in Ballycastle.

Kearney interviewed for the St Mirren job in June 2018, but Alan Stubbs was appointed instead. Stubbs was sacked by St Mirren after four matches in the 2018–19 Scottish Premiership, and Kearney was appointed as his replacement. St Mirren finished 11th in the Premiership and avoided relegation by winning a play-off against Dundee United. Kearney left St Mirren on 26 June 2019, after only 10 months at the club.

He returned to Coleraine in July 2019 for a second spell as their manager. In May 2024, Kearney stepped down as manager to move into a sporting director position.

In May 2025, Kearney left his role of Sporting Director at Coleraine, quickly following manager Dean Shiels, his brother-in-law, out of the club.

On 7th December 2025, it was announced that Kearney had been appointed manager of Ballymena United, a team he made 121 appearances for as a player.

== Personal life ==
Kearney is the son-in-law of former Derry City manager Kenny Shiels, and brother-in-law of Dean Shiels who was a former manager of Coleraine.

== Managerial statistics ==
As of match played 21 November 2026

Managerial record by team and tenure
Team	From	To	Record					Ref.
Team	From	To	P	W	D	L	Win %	Ref.
Limavady United	4 May 2009	5 February 2011	47	29	6	12	61.70	
Coleraine	5 February 2011	7 September 2018	336	155	85	96	46.13	
St Mirren	7 September 2018	26 June 2019	38	8	10	20	21.05	
Coleraine	3 July 2019	31 May 2024	222	106	51	65	47.75	
Ballymena United	7 December 2025	Present	38	9	11	18	23.68	
Total			681	307	163	211	45.08	—

== Honours ==
=== Player ===
Linfield

- IFA Premiership: 2005–06, 2006–07, 2007–08
- Irish Cup: 2005–06, 2006–07, 2007–08
- Irish League Cup: 2005–06, 2007–08
- County Antrim Shield: 2005-06
- Setanta Cup: 2005

=== Manager ===
Coleraine

- Irish Cup: 2017–18
- League Cup: 2019-20

St Mirren

- Scottish Premiership play-offs: 2018–19
