= Michael Gault =

Northern Irish footballer and manager

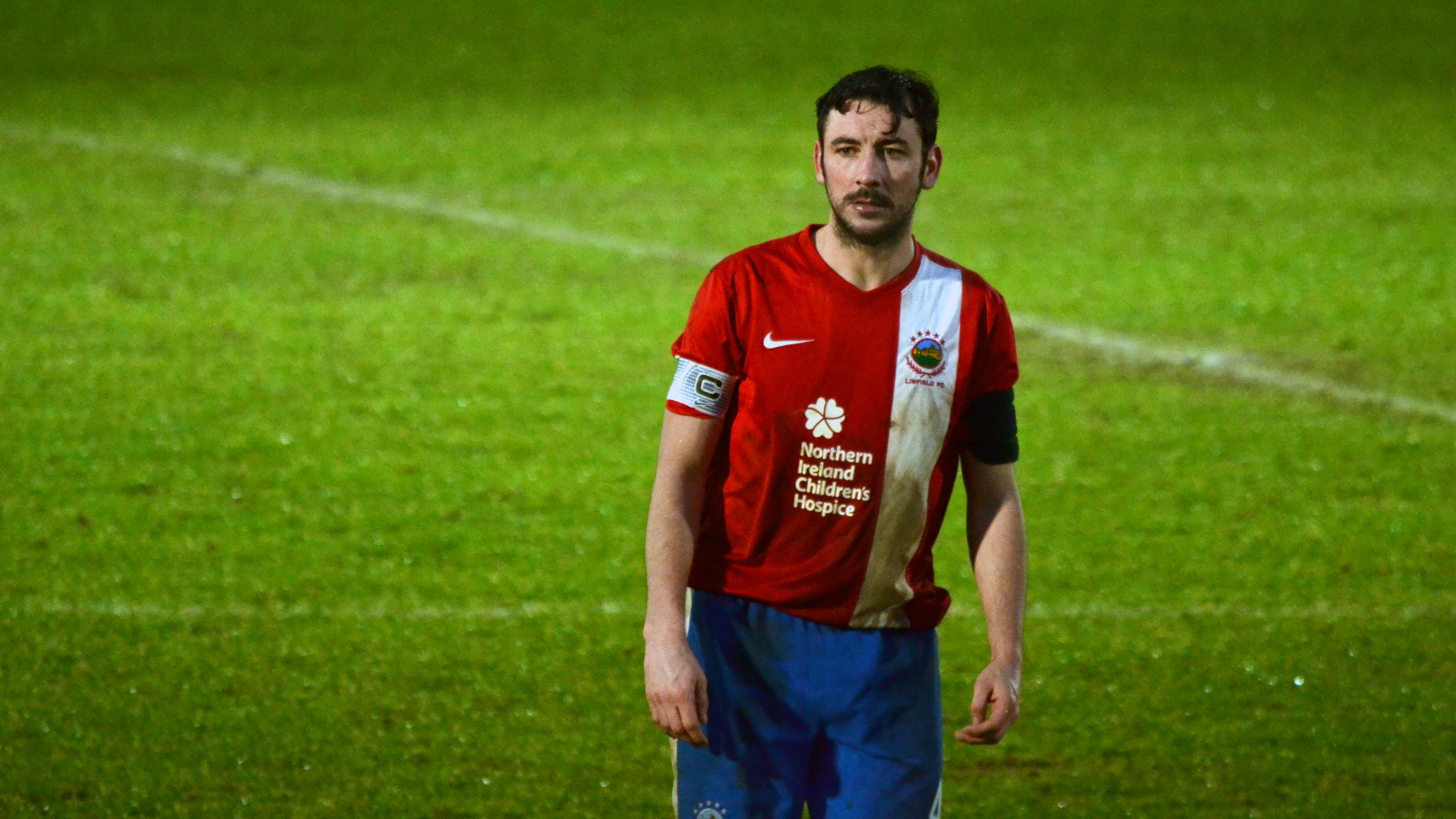
- Gault playing for Linfield in 2014.

Personal information
- Date of birth: 15 April 1983 (age 43)
- Place of birth: Lisburn, Northern Ireland
- Position: Midfielder

Team information
- Current team: Linfield

Senior career*
Years	Team	Apps	(Gls)
2001–2014	Linfield	480	(30)
2014–2016	Portadown	56	(2)
2016–2017	Crusaders	23	(0)
2017–2018	Ballymena United	10	(0)
2018–2019	Annagh United	18	(1)
2019–2020	Ballymacash Rangers	17	(0)

International career
2008	Northern Ireland	1	(0)

Managerial career
- 2019–2020: Ballymacash Rangers
- 2020–: Linfield Swifts
- * Club domestic league appearances and goals

Michael Gault (born 15 April 1983) is a Northern Irish football former player who manages Linfield Swifts. He previously managed Ballymacash Rangers from 2019 to 2020.

== Club career ==
Born in Lisburn, Gault began his senior career with Linfield in the 2001–02 season. He signed a professional three-and-a-half-year contract in April 2003, signing extensions in May 2006, May 2009, and March 2012. During the 2012 extension Gault, who was club captain, lost his full-time professional status.

He was released by Linfield in May 2014, signing for Portadown later that month. He received a total of 21 yellow cards in 29 games in the 2015/16 season. In January 2016 it was announced he would leave the club in the summer after he signed a pre-contract agreement with Crusaders.

In July 2019, Michael Gault was appointed player manager of Mid-Ulster Football League club Ballymacash Rangers F.C.

Michael made 17 appearances playing for Ballymacash Rangers F.C. before retiring in August 2020 to focus on management.

== Managerial career ==
Michael Gault took his first steps into management in July 2019 when he was appointed player manager of Ballymacash Rangers F.C.

Michael retired from playing in August 2020 and his sole responsibility at the club was then management. In his first season, which was brought to an early finish in March 2020 due to the COVID-19 pandemic, Michael led his side to a 2nd placed finish in the Mid-Ulster Football League Intermediate A division and a domestic cup final.

Michael stepped down from his role at The Bluebell to take up a role with Linfield as Manager of their Under 18 side. Gault is now manager of Linfield Swifts.

== International career ==
Gault was called up to the Northern Ireland national team for the first time in October 2008. He made his international debut in a friendly match against Georgia in March 2008; Michael O'Connor also made his international debut in the same match.

== Personal life ==
In 2003 Gault was studying computers at Ulster University; by 2006 he was studying sports science at their Jordanstown campus. Michael Gault is a qualified PE teacher and also a fully qualified Financial Advisor

== Honours ==
=== Team ===
- Linfield
  - Irish League: 7
    - 2003–04, 2005–06, 2006–07, 2007–08, 2009–10, 2010–11, 2011–12
  - Irish Cup: 6
    - 2005–06, 2006–07, 2007–08, 2009–10, 2010–11, 2011–12
  - Irish League Cup: 3
    - 2001–02, 2005–06, 2007–08
  - County Antrim Shield: 5
    - 2000–01, 2003–04, 2004–05, 2005–06, 2013–14
  - Setanta Cup: 1
    - 2005

=== Individual ===
- Irish League Player of the Month (2): March 2003, January 2006
- Linfield Player of the Year (1): 2010–11
- Northern Ireland Football Writers Player of the Year (1): 2007–08
