= Scott Young (Scottish footballer) =

Scottish footballer and manager

Personal information
- Date of birth: 5 April 1977 (age 49)
- Place of birth: Glasgow, Scotland
- Position: Midfielder

Youth career
- –1994: West Park United

Senior career*
Years	Team	Apps	(Gls)
1994–1996	St Johnstone	6	(1)
1996–1998	Dunfermline	2	(1)
1998–2006	Glentoran	143	(19)
Total		151	(21)

Managerial career
- 2010–2012: Glentoran
- * Club domestic league appearances and goals

Scott Young (born 5 April 1977) is a Scottish former professional football player and manager.

== Club career ==
Young started his career in his native Scotland, making a handful of appearances for St Johnstone and then Dunfermline. He moved to Northern Ireland in 1998 when he was signed by manager Roy Coyle for East Belfast club Glentoran. He was a key player and fan favourite, but suffered a torrid time with injuries, suffering three broken legs in two years, which eventually caused his retirement in 2006.

== Management career ==
He succeeded Alan McDonald to become Glentoran manager on 1 March 2010 along with Pete Beaty as his assistant and Tim McCann as coach. Only a few weeks later after being appointed manager, he won the first trophy of his managerial career after leading the East Belfast side to the Irish League Cup with a win over Coleraine in the final.

Young signed a new contract just before the new season started, and Roy Coyle was appointed Director of Football. Young brought some talent out of players who were rarely utilised under previous manager McDonald. Matty Burrows was one of them after Burrows scored a goal against Portadown that was later nominated for the FIFA Puskás Award for goal of the year in 2010. Daryl Fordyce was another player that started playing very well at the start of the season. Against Lisburn Distillery, Fordyce scored five goals in a 6–1 win over Distillery. Young then led Glentoran to the County Antrim Shield after defeating arch rivals Linfield 3–1 in the final.

However, things did not go well for Young in the league, and Glentoran's off the field financial problems added to the struggle. In Young's second full season, he signed Coleraine pair Stephen Carson and Darren Boyce along with Linfield defender Aiden O'Kane and former Crusaders keeper Aaron Hogg. Young led Glentoran to the County Antrim Shield final again, but they lost out to Cliftonville in the final.

His lowest ebb came on 14 January 2012, after Glentoran were defeated at home in the Irish Cup fifth round by Northern Amateur League side Newington Youth Club. Young resigned the next day.

== Personal life ==
His brother, David Young also moved from Scotland to Northern Ireland to play football. He played for Portadown.

== Honours ==
=== Player ===
Glentoran

- Irish Premier League (3): 1998–99, 2002–03, 2004–05
- Irish Cup (3): 1999–2000, 2000–01, 2003–04
- Irish League Cup (3): 2000–01, 2002–03, 2004–05
- County Antrim Shield (5): 1998–99, 1999–2000, 2000–01, 2001–02, 2002–03
- Gold Cup (3): 1998–99, 1999–2000, 2000–01

=== Manager ===
Glentoran

- Irish League Cup (1): 2009–10
- County Antrim Shield (1): 2010-11
