= Michael Newberry (footballer) =

English footballer (1997–2024)

Personal information
- Date of birth: 30 December 1997
- Place of birth: Newcastle upon Tyne, England
- Date of death: 30 December 2024 (aged 27)
- Position: Defender

Youth career
- –2009: Red House Farm JFC
- 2009–2018: Newcastle United

Senior career*
Years	Team	Apps	(Gls)
2018–2020	Víkingur Ólafsvík	60	(0)
2021–2024	Linfield	55	(3)
2024	Cliftonville	19	(0)
Total		134	(3)

International career
2014	Northern Ireland U19	6	(2)
- * Club domestic league appearances and goals

Michael Newberry (30 December 1997 – 30 December 2024) was an English professional footballer who played as a defender. He began his career at Newcastle United, before spells in Iceland with Víkingur Ólafsvík and in Northern Ireland with Linfield and Cliftonville. Born in England, he represented Northern Ireland internationally at youth level. He could operate as a centre-back or full-back.

== Early life ==
Newberry grew up in Newcastle upon Tyne, England but had familial background from Northern Ireland.

== Career ==
Newberry joined the youth academy of English side Newcastle United at the age of 11, from the Gosforth based club, Red House Farm JFC. Awarded the Wor Jackie Trophy in 2016, he was regarded as a prospect while playing for the club but never made an appearance for their first team. This was attributed to the fact he had hairline fractures in his spine that led to eight months out after the injury recurred during rehabilitation. In 2018, he went on loan to Iceland's Víkingur Ólafsvík before making the move permanent. He played in 65 first time matches for them. In 2021, Newberry joined the Northern Irish club Linfield. During his time with Linfield, he won two NIFL Premierships and one Irish Cup. In 2024, he moved to Cliftonville.

== International career ==
Newberry represented Northern Ireland internationally at youth level due to his family connections. In the Autumn of 2015, he played for the Northern Ireland U19s in the European Championship qualification, but he was unable to take part in the elite round the following spring due to back injuries.

== Death ==
After having played in the Boxing Day North Belfast derby against Crusaders, Newberry died suddenly on 30 December 2024, his 27th birthday. Cliftonville and Linfield's scheduled matches that day were postponed as a mark of respect. Other matches in the NIFL Premiership held a minute's silence prior to kick-off.

== Career statistics ==
=== Club ===
Appearances and goals by club, season and competition
Club	Season	League			National cup		League cup		Continental		Other		Total	
Club	Season	Division	Apps	Goals	Apps	Goals	Apps	Goals	Apps	Goals	Apps	Goals	Apps	Goals
Ungmennafélagið Víkingur	2018	1. deild karla	20	0	2	0	—		—		—		22	0
Ungmennafélagið Víkingur	2019	1. deild karla	21	0	—		—		—		—		21	0
Ungmennafélagið Víkingur	2020	1. deild karla	19	0	1	0	—		—		—		20	0
Ungmennafélagið Víkingur	Total		60	0	3	0	—		—		—		63	0
Linfield	2020–21	NIFL Premiership	6	1	2	0	—		—		—		8	1
Linfield	2021–22	NIFL Premiership	18	1	0	0	2	2	6 (Note: Two appearances in UEFA Champions League, Four appearances, 1 goal in UEFA Europa Conference League)	1	—		26	4
Linfield	2022–23	NIFL Premiership	15	1	2	0	2	0	2 (Note: One appearance in UEFA Europa League, One appearance in UEFA Europa Conference League)	0	3 (Note: One appearance in NIFL Charity Shield, Two appearances in Scottish Challenge Cup)	0	24	1
Linfield	2023–24	NIFL Premiership	16	0	2	0	4	0	2 (Note: Appearance(s) in UEFA Europa Conference League)	0	—		24	0
Linfield	Total		55	3	6	0	8	2	10	1	3	0	82	6
Cliftonville	2024–25	NIFL Premiership	19	0	—		—		2	0	1 (Note: Appearance(s) in NIFL Charity Shield)	0	22	0
Career total			134	3	9	0	8	2	12	1	4	0	167	6

== Honours ==
Linfield

- NIFL Premiership: 2020–21, 2021–22
- Irish Cup: 2020–21
- Irish League Cup: 2022–23, 2023–2024

Cliftonville

- Irish League Cup: 2024-25 (posthumous)
