= 2024–25 Northern Ireland Football League Cup =

BetMcLean League Cup

Tournament details
- Country: Northern Ireland
- Dates: 13 Aug 2024 – 9 Mar 2025
- Teams: 38

Final positions
- Champions: Cliftonville (7th title)
- Runners-up: Glentoran

Tournament statistics
- Matches played: 37
- Goals scored: 136 (3.68 per match)

The 2024–25 Northern Ireland Football League Cup (known as the BetMcLean Cup for sponsorship purposes) was the 38th edition of Northern Ireland's football knockout cup competition for national league clubs, and the ninth edition of the competition as the Northern Ireland Football League Cup. The competition was contested by the 38 member clubs of the Northern Ireland Football League, commencing on 13 August 2024 with the preliminary round and concluding with the final on 9 March 2025. The competition was sponsored by McLean Bookmakers, the title sponsors of the cup since the 2017–18 season.

Linfield were the defending champions after defeating Portadown 3–1 in the 2024 final to win the competition for a record 12th time. This season, Cliftonville defeated Glentoran 1–0 to win the trophy for the seventh time.

== Format and schedule ==
The competition was open to the 38 members of the Northern Ireland Football League (NIFL). The 14 NIFL Premier Intermediate League clubs entered the draw for the preliminary round, with 12 of those clubs being drawn to face each other in six ties and the remaining two clubs receiving byes. The six preliminary round winners and the two clubs which received byes joined the remaining 24 clubs from the NIFL Premiership and NIFL Championship in the first round. The 16 highest-ranked clubs from the previous season's league system (all 12 NIFL Premiership clubs along with the top 4 NIFL Championship clubs) were then seeded in the first round to avoid drawing each other. The first round was the only round of the competition in which seeding is used. From there on the competition used an open draw with a standard knockout format, with the remaining rounds consisting of the second round, quarter-finals, semi-finals and the final. Replays were not used in the competition, with all matches using extra time and penalties to determine the winner if necessary.

Round	First match date	Fixtures	Clubs
Preliminary round	13 August 2024	6	38 → 32
First round	1 October 2024	16	32 → 16
Second round	5 November 2024	8	16 → 8
Quarter-finals	3 December 2024	4	8 → 4
Semi-finals	14 January 2025	2	4 → 2
Final	9 March 2025	1	2 → 1

== Results ==
The league tier of each club at the time of entering the competition is listed in parentheses.

(1) = NIFL Premiership
(2) = NIFL Championship
(3) = NIFL Premier Intermediate League

=== Preliminary round ===
The Preliminary round draw was made on 16 July 2024. The matches were played on 13 August 2024.

Team 1	Score	Team 2
13 August 2024
Ballymacash Rangers (3)	3–0	Banbridge Town (3)
Dergview (3)	2–1	Knockbreda (3)
Moyola Park (3)	3–1	Oxford Sunnyside (3)
Rathfriland Rangers (3)	2–1	Coagh United (3)
Warrenpoint Town (3)	2–0 (a.e.t.)	Lisburn Distilllery (3)
Tobermore United (3)	3–4 (a.e.t.)	Queen's University (3)

=== First round ===
The First round draw was made on 12 September 2024. The matches were played on 1 October 2024. The top 16 league clubs from the previous season were seeded in this round in order to avoid drawing each other.

Team 1	Score	Team 2
Ballinamallard United (2)	0–4	Coleraine (1)
Ballyclare Comrades (2)	2–3	Crusaders (1)
Ballymacash Rangers (3)	0–1	Institute (2)
Bangor (2)	4–0	Warrenpoint Town (3)
Carrick Rangers (1)	0–1	Queen's University (3)
Dollingstown (2)	5–1	Newry City (2)
Dundela	0–3	Linfield (1)
Dungannon Swifts (1)	5–0	Portstewart (2)
Glentoran (1)	2–0	Dergview (3)
Harland & Wolff Welders (2)	1–2	Larne (1)
Limavady United (3)	0–2	Cliftonville (1)
Loughgall (1)	2–3	Armagh City (2)
Moyola Park (3)	2–4 (a.e.t.)	Annagh United (2)
Newington (2)	2–3	Glenavon (1)
Portadown (1)	0–1	Ards (2)
Rathfriland Rangers (3)	3–3 (a.e.t.) (4–5 p)	Ballymena United (1)

=== Second round ===
The second round draw was made on 2 October 2024.

Team 1	Score	Team 2
5 November 2024
Annagh United (2)	2–0	Queen's University (3)
Armagh City (2)	0–0 (a.e.t.) (8–7 p)	Glenavon (1)
Ballymena United (1)	1–0	Ards (2)
Bangor (2)	0–1	Cliftonville (1)
Crusaders (1)	2–1	Coleraine (1)
Dungannon Swifts (1)	3–1	Dollingstown (2)
19 November 2024
Institute (2)	0–2	Larne (1)
3 December 2024
Linfield (1)	0–1	Glentoran (1)

=== Quarter-finals ===
The quarter-final and semi-final draws were both made on 6 November 2024.

Team 1	Score	Team 2
3 December 2024
Crusaders (1)	4–2	Dungannon Swifts (1)
4 December 2024
Annagh United (2)	0–5	Larne (1)
Armagh City (2)	0–3	Cliftonville (1)
7 January 2025
Glentoran (1)	2–0	Ballymena United (1)

=== Semi-finals ===
The semi-final matches were played on 14 January 2025.

Team 1	Score	Team 2
Glentoran (1)	4–2 (a.e.t.)	Crusaders (1)
Larne (1)	0–1 (a.e.t.)	Cliftonville (1)

=== Final ===
The final was played on 9 March 2025 at Windsor Park, Belfast. This was the fourth consecutive season that the final was played on a Sunday.

9 March 2025
15:00 GMT

Cliftonville (1)	1 – 0 (a.e.t.)	Glentoran (1)
Joe Gormley 99'

Windsor Park, Belfast
Attendance: 14,539
Referee: Shane Andrews
