= 1996–97 Irish League Cup =

Wilkinson Sword League Cup

Tournament details
- Country: Northern Ireland
- Teams: 32

Final positions
- Champions: Crusaders (1st win)
- Runners-up: Glentoran

Tournament statistics
- Matches played: 31
- Goals scored: 122 (3.94 per match)

The 1996–97 Irish League Cup (known as the Wilkinson Sword League Cup for sponsorship reasons) was the 11th edition of the Irish League Cup, Northern Ireland's secondary football knockout cup competition. It concluded on 15 October 1996 with the final.

Portadown unsuccessfully defended its 1996 title in the semifinals to Glentoran. Glentoran unsuccessfully defend its pursuit of a title in the final against the Crusaders, 1–0.

== First round ==
Team 1	Score	Team 2
Ards	3–1	Chimney Corner
Ballyclare Comrades	1–0	Armagh City
Ballymoney United	1–2	Newry Town
Banbridge Town	4–4 (4–5 p)	Distillery
Bangor	2–0	RUC
Carrick Rangers	2–1	Institute
Coleraine	5–1	Limavady United
Crusaders	1–0	Brantwood
Dungannon Swifts	1–0	Ballymena United
Glenavon	4–0	Dundela
Glentoran	3–0	Moyola Park
Larne	0–1	Harland & Wolff Welders
Linfield	8–2	Tobermore United
Loughgall	3–2	Cliftonville
Omagh Town	10–0	Cookstown United
Portadown	3–0	Ballinamallard United

== Second round ==
Team 1	Score	Team 2
Ards	0–3	Crusaders
Ballyclare Comrades	2–4	Omagh Town
Carrick Rangers	3–2	Harland & Wolff Welders
Coleraine	3–2	Glenavon
Distillery	1–0	Bangor
Glentoran	3–1	Dungannon Swifts
Linfield	5–0	Loughgall
Portadown	2–1	Newry Town

== Quarter-finals ==
Team 1	Score	Team 2
Carrick Rangers	1–4	Linfield
Crusaders	4–2	Omagh Town
Distillery	1–3	Portadown
Glentoran	4–0	Coleraine

== Semi-finals ==
Team 1	Score	Team 2
Crusaders	1–1 (4–1 p)	Linfield
Portadown	1–2	Glentoran

== Final ==
15 October 1996

Crusaders	1 – 0	Glentoran
Dully 57'	Report

Windsor Park, Belfast
Attendance: 3,000
