= 2019–20 Northern Ireland Football League Cup =

BetMcLean League Cup

Tournament details
- Country: Northern Ireland
- Dates: 10 August 2019 – 15 February 2020
- Teams: 35

Final positions
- Champions: Coleraine (2nd win)
- Runners-up: Crusaders

Tournament statistics
- Matches played: 34
- Goals scored: 146 (4.29 per match)

The 2019–20 Northern Ireland Football League Cup (known as the BetMcLean League Cup for sponsorship purposes) was the 34th edition of Northern Ireland's football knockout cup competition for national league clubs, and the sixth edition of the competition as the Northern Ireland Football League Cup. This season's League Cup was contested by 35 of the 36 clubs that started the season in the three divisions of the Northern Ireland Football League. The competition began on 10 August 2019 with the first round, and concluded on 15 February 2020 with the final. The competition was sponsored by McLean Bookmakers.

Linfield were the defending champions, having beaten Ballymena United 1–0 in the 2019 final to lift the League Cup for a record tenth time. However, their defence of the cup came to an end after a defeat against Coleraine in the semi-finals. Coleraine would go on to win the cup for the second time, with a 2–1 win over Crusaders in the final. This was their first League Cup title in 32 years, since winning the 1987–88 competition - a new record for the longest gap between League Cup titles. Crusaders suffered defeat in a League Cup final for the sixth time - another new record in the competition.

== Format and schedule ==
The competition was open to the 35 members of the Northern Ireland Football League (NIFL). The top sixteen ranked clubs from the 2018–19 season (all twelve 2018–19 NIFL Premiership clubs, along with the top four clubs from the 2018–19 NIFL Championship) entered the competition in the second round as seeds. Of the remaining twenty NIFL clubs, eight of them were randomly drawn to face each other in four first round matches. The remaining twelve clubs, along with the four first round winners, made up the sixteen unseeded clubs in the second round. Lurgan Celtic were included in the original draw, but later withdrew from the Northern Ireland Football League for financial reasons. This meant that Crusaders received a bye into the third round.

From the third round onwards, the competition operated in a straight knockout format. Replays were not used in the competition, with all matches using extra time and penalties to determine the winner if necessary.

Round	First match date	Fixtures	Clubs
First round	10 August 2019	4	35 → 31
Second round	27 August 2019	15	31 → 16
Third round	8 October 2019	8	16 → 8
Quarter-finals	29 October 2019	4	8 → 4
Semi-finals	3 December 2019	2	4 → 2
Final	15 February 2020	1	2 → 1

== Results ==
The league tier of each club at the time of entering the competition is listed in parentheses.

=== First round ===
The first round matches took place on 10 August 2019.

Team 1	Score	Team 2
Armagh City (3)	0–6	**Harland & Wolff Welders (2)**
**Ballyclare Comrades (2)**	7–1	Knockbreda (2)
**Loughgall (2)**	2–1	Banbridge Town (3)
**PSNI (2)**	3–1	Queen's University (2)

=== Second round ===
The second round matches were played on 27 and 28 August 2019. The top 16 league clubs from the previous season were seeded in this round in order to avoid drawing each other. As a result of Lurgan Celtic's withdrawal from the league, Crusaders received a bye into the third round.

Team 1	Score	Team 2
27 August 2019
**Ballymena United (1)**	3–0	Newington (3)
**Bangor (3)**	5–3 (aet)	Carrick Rangers (1)
**Coleraine (1)**	4–0	Annagh United (3)
**Dundela (2)**	6–0	Tobermore United (3)
**Dungannon Swifts (1)**	2–0	Dergview (2)
**Glenavon (1)**	4–1	Portstewart (3)
**Glentoran (1)**	5–1	Ballyclare Comrades (2)
**Larne (1)**	3–0	Lisburn Distillery (3)
**Limavady United (3)**	4–2	Ards (2)
Loughgall (2)	0–1	**Newry City (2)**
Moyola Park (3)	1–3	**Cliftonville (1)**
Portadown (2)	1–2	**Dollingstown (3)**
Warrenpoint Town (1)	2–4	**Harland & Wolff Welders (2)**
28 August 2019
**Institute (1)**	3–2	PSNI (2)
17 September 2019
Ballinamallard United (2)	4–5 (aet)	**Linfield (1)**

Seeded	Unseeded
Ards (2); **Ballymena United (1)**; Carrick Rangers (1); **Cliftonville (1)**; **Coleraine (1)**; **Crusaders (1) (bye)**; **Dundela (2)**; **Dungannon Swifts (1)**; **Glenavon (1)**; **Glentoran (1)**; **Institute (1)**; **Larne (1)**; **Linfield (1)**; **Newry City (2)**; Portadown (2); Warrenpoint Town (1)	Annagh United (3); Ballinamallard United (2); Ballyclare Comrades (2); **Bangor (3)**; Dergview (2); **Dollingstown (3)**; **Harland & Wolff Welders (2)**; **Limavady United (3)**; Lisburn Distillery (3); Loughgall (2); Moyola Park (3); Newington (3); Portstewart (3); PSNI (2); Tobermore United (3)
Clubs in **bold** = Second round winners

=== Third round ===
The third round matches were played on 8 and 23 October 2019.

Team 1	Score	Team 2
8 October 2019
**Ballymena United (1)**	6–0	Dollingstown (3)
**Cliftonville (1)**	3–2	Bangor (3)
**Coleraine (1)**	2–1	Glentoran (1)
Dungannon Swifts (1)	0–4	**Linfield (1)**
**Institute (1)**	3–0	Harland & Wolff Welders (2)
Larne (1)	1–3	**Dundela (2)**
Limavady United (3)	1–4	**Crusaders (1)**
23 October 2019
Glenavon (1)	2–3	**Newry City (2)**

=== Quarter-finals ===
The quarter-finals were played on 29 October 2019.

Team 1	Score	Team 2
Ballymena United (1)	1–2 (aet)	**Crusaders (1)**
Dundela (2)	1–5	**Coleraine (1)**
**Linfield (1)**	1–0	Cliftonville (1)
Newry City (2)	0–1	**Institute (1)**

=== Semi-finals ===
The semi-finals took place on 3 December 2019.

Team 1	Score	Team 2
**Crusaders (1)**	2–0	Institute (1)
Linfield (1)	0–3	**Coleraine (1)**

=== Final ===
The final was played on 15 February 2020 at Windsor Park, Belfast.

15 February 2020
19:30 GMT

Coleraine (1)	2 – 1	Crusaders (1)
Lowry 37' (pen.); McLaughlin 52'	NIFL; BBC Sport	McGonigle 10'

Windsor Park, Belfast
Attendance: 4,688
Referee: Ian McNabb
