= 1998–99 Irish League Cup =

Coca-Cola League Cup

Tournament details
- Country: Northern Ireland
- Teams: 18

Final positions
- Champions: Linfield (5th win)
- Runners-up: Glentoran

Tournament statistics
- Matches played: 17
- Goals scored: 67 (3.94 per match)

The 1998–99 Irish League Cup (known as the Coca-Cola League Cup for sponsorship reasons) was the 13th edition of the Irish League Cup, Northern Ireland's secondary football knock-out cup competition. It concluded on 4 May 1999 with the final.

Linfield were the defending champions after their fourth League Cup win last season; a 1–0 victory over Glentoran in the previous final. This season they became the first club ever to successfully defend the trophy. In a repeat of the previous final, Linfield once again came out on top with a 2–1 extra time victory against Glentoran in the final, lifting the cup for the fifth time and condemning the Glens to defeat in the final for the third season running, which is a record for successive final defeats in the competition that still stands.

The competition was re-structured this season, allowing only the 10 top-flight clubs and the 8 second-tier clubs to enter. This reduced the number of clubs taking part from 32 down to 18.

== Preliminary round ==
Team 1	Score	Team 2
Newry Town	0–1	Larne
Omagh Town	4–3	Limavady United

== First round ==
Team 1	Score	Team 2
Ballyclare Comrades	1–4	Glenavon
Ballymena United	2–3	Linfield
Bangor	3–4	Ards
Carrick Rangers	2–1	Coleraine
Crusaders	3–1	Larne
Glentoran	8–0	Dungannon Swifts
Omagh Town	2–3	Distillery
Portadown	0–2	Cliftonville

== Quarter-finals ==
Team 1	Score	Team 2
Carrick Rangers	2–1	Ards
Crusaders	1–2	Cliftonville
Glenavon	1–2	Linfield
Glentoran	2–1	Distillery

== Semi-finals ==
Team 1	Score	Team 2
Cliftonville	1–2	Linfield
Glentoran	1–0	Carrick Rangers

== Final ==
4 May 1999

Linfield	2 – 1 (a.e.t.)	Glentoran
Ferguson 94', 112'	Report	Young 97'

Windsor Park, Belfast
