= 2008–09 Irish League Cup =

Co-Operative Insurance Cup

Tournament details
- Country: Northern Ireland
- Teams: 29

Final positions
- Champions: Portadown (2nd win)
- Runners-up: Newry City

Tournament statistics
- Matches played: 52
- Goals scored: 183 (3.52 per match)

The 2008–09 Irish League Cup (known as the Co-operative Insurance Cup for sponsorship reasons) was the 23rd edition of the Irish League Cup, Northern Ireland's secondary football knock-out cup competition. The tournament started on 26 August 2008 with the qualifying round and ended on 28 February 2009 with the final.

Linfield were the defending champions after their ninth League Cup win last season; a 3–2 victory over Crusaders in the previous final. This season Linfield went out at the quarter-final stage to eventual winners Portadown, who defeated Newry City 1–0 in the final. This was Portadown's second League Cup win, and first one since 1995–96. This was also only the second time in twelve years that the cup had not been won by one of Belfast's Big Two.

The competition was expanded this season and the format was also changed due to a re-structuring of the league system. 29 clubs were now eligible to take part in the competition; the 12 members of the IFA Premiership and the 17 members of the IFA Championship, with the Premiership clubs entering in the third round. The group stage format used in previous seasons was dropped in favour of home and away two-legged aggregate score ties with an away goals rule.

== Qualifying round ==
The qualifying round was held in order to reduce the number of teams competing in the first round to 16. The match was played on 26 August 2008.

Team 1	Score	Team 2
Glebe Rangers	3–0	Killymoon Rangers

== First round ==
In this round entered the winners from the previous round, Glebe Rangers, as well as the remaining 15 teams from the IFA Championship. The first legs were played on 29 and 30 August 2008. The second legs were played on 2, 3 and 9 September 2008.

Team 1	Agg.	Team 2	1st leg	2nd leg
Ballyclare Comrades	4–1	Dergview	2–0	2–1
Banbridge Town	3–3 (a)	Armagh City	2–0	1–3
Carrick Rangers	4–4 (a)	Glebe Rangers	1–2	3–2
Coagh United	4–6	Limavady United	2–1	2–5
Donegal Celtic	2–6	Ards	2–1	0–5
Larne	5–1	Tobermore United	2–0	3–1
Loughgall	1–1 (a)	Ballinamallard United	0–0	1–1
Portadown	7–2	Ballymoney United	3–1	4–1

== Second round ==
In this round entered the eight winners from the previous round. The first legs were played on 20 September 2008. The second legs were played on 23, 24 September and 1 October 2008.

Team 1	Agg.	Team 2	1st leg	2nd leg
Ards	4–1	Limavady United	3–1	1–0
Banbridge Town	4–6	Loughgall	1–3	3–3
Carrick Rangers	4–2	Ballyclare Comrades	1–1	3–1
Portadown	7–1	Larne	2–1	5–0

== Third round ==
In this round entered the four winners from the previous round, together with the 12 members of the IFA Premiership. The first legs were played on 21, 22, 28 and 29 October 2008. The second legs were played on 4, 5, 11 and 12 November 2008.

Team 1	Agg.	Team 2	1st leg	2nd leg
Ards	2–11	Newry City	1–5	1–6
Ballymena United	3–4	Glentoran	1–3	2–1
Bangor	1–4	Lisburn Distillery	1–4	0–0
Carrick Rangers	4–8	Coleraine	3–4	1–4
Glenavon	4–2	Crusaders	2–1	2–1
Linfield	4–4 (a)	Dungannon Swifts	0–3	4–1
Loughgall	3–1	Institute	0–0	3–1
Portadown	4–3	Cliftonville	0–0	4–3

== Quarter-finals ==
The first legs were played on 2 and 3 December 2008. The second legs were played on 16 and 17 December 2008.

Team 1	Agg.	Team 2	1st leg	2nd leg
Glenavon	1–2	Lisburn Distillery	1–1	0–1
Glentoran	3–1	Coleraine	1–1	2–0
Newry City	8–8 (a)	Loughgall	3–2	5–6 (aet)
Portadown	3–0	Linfield	2–0	1–0

== Semi-finals ==
20 January 2009

Lisburn Distillery	2 – 3 (a.e.t.)	Newry City
Patton 43'; Allen 86'	Report	Garrett 58', 65'; Clarke 115'

Mourneview Park, Lurgan
Referee: Mark Courtney

21 January 2009

Glentoran	1 – 2 (a.e.t.)	Portadown
Waterworth 12'	Report	Boyle 45'; Lecky 110'

Windsor Park, Belfast
Referee: David Malcolm

== Final ==
28 February 2009
14:30 UTC

Newry City	0 – 1	Portadown
	Report	McCutcheon 30'

Mourneview Park, Lurgan
Referee: Adrian McCourt
