= 2003–04 Irish League Cup =

CIS Insurance Cup

Tournament details
- Country: Northern Ireland
- Teams: 16

Final positions
- Champions: Cliftonville (1st win)
- Runners-up: Larne

Tournament statistics
- Matches played: 54
- Goals scored: 159 (2.94 per match)

The 2003–04 Irish League Cup (known as the CIS Insurance Cup for sponsorship reasons) was the 18th edition of the Irish League Cup, Northern Ireland's secondary football knock-out cup competition. It concluded on 11 November 2003 with the final.

Glentoran were the defending champions after their fourth League Cup win last season; a 2–0 victory over Linfield in the previous final. This season the Glens reached the semi-finals but were later disqualified from the competition for fielding an ineligible player in an earlier match. As a result, Larne were given a walkover into the final where they were defeated on penalties by Cliftonville, who won the Cup for the first time. This was Cliftonville's second appearance in the final, and first since the 1994–95 final. It was also the first final in eight years not to feature either Linfield or Glentoran.

As a result of a restructuring of the league system, the number of clubs eligible to take part in the competition this season was reduced to 16. The 16 clubs taking part were divided into four groups of four clubs. The clubs in each group played each other at home and away. The top two clubs from each group then advanced to the quarter-finals where they played a single knock-out tie against another quarter-finalist. The semi-finals were played in the same format with the two winners of the ties advancing to the single match final.

== Group stage ==
=== Group A ===
Team	Pld	W	D	L	GF	GA	GD	Pts	GLT	CLI	OMA	DUN
Glentoran (A)	6	6	0	0	18	1	+17	18		2–0	3–1	8–0
Cliftonville (A)	6	2	0	4	5	6	−1	6	0–1		0–1	0–1
Omagh Town	6	2	0	4	5	8	−3	6	0–2	1–2		0–1
Dungannon Swifts	6	2	0	4	2	15	−13	6	0–2	0–3	0–2	

Source: rsssf.com
(A) Advanced to quarter-finals

=== Group B ===
Team	Pld	W	D	L	GF	GA	GD	Pts	POR	INS	GLA	BYM
Portadown (A)	6	4	2	0	13	5	+8	14		0–0	1–0	3–1
Institute (A)	6	3	1	2	11	9	+2	10	2–4		0–2	3–2
Glenavon	6	2	1	3	7	8	−1	7	2–2	0–3		0–1
Ballymena United	6	1	0	5	6	15	−9	3	0–3	1–3	1–3	

Source: rsssf.com
(A) Advanced to quarter-finals

=== Group C ===
Team	Pld	W	D	L	GF	GA	GD	Pts	COL	CRU	ARD	LIM
Coleraine (A)	6	4	1	1	16	7	+9	13		2–4	3–1	4–1
Crusaders (A)	6	3	2	1	8	4	+4	11	0–0		0–0	1–0
Ards	6	3	1	2	7	9	−2	10	1–4	1–0		2–0
Limavady United	6	0	0	6	3	14	−11	0	0–3	1–3	1–3	

Source: rsssf.com
(A) Advanced to quarter-finals

=== Group D ===
Team	Pld	W	D	L	GF	GA	GD	Pts	LIN	LRN	LIS	NEW
Linfield (A)	6	6	0	0	17	4	+13	18		5–2	1–0	3–0
Larne (A)	6	4	0	2	9	7	+2	12	0–1		2–0	2–0
Lisburn Distillery	6	1	0	5	6	12	−6	3	1–3	1–2		2–1
Newry Town	6	1	0	5	5	14	−9	3	1–4	0–1	3–2	

Source: rsssf.com
(A) Advanced to quarter-finals

== Quarter-finals ==
Team 1	Score	Team 2
Coleraine	2–4	Larne
Glentoran	6–1	Institute
Linfield	0–1	Crusaders
Portadown	0–3	Cliftonville

== Semi-finals ==
Team 1	Score	Team 2
Glentoran	w/o	Larne^{1}
Cliftonville	1–1 (4–1 p)	Crusaders

^{1} Glentoran were disqualified for fielding an ineligible player. Larne received a walkover into the final.

== Final ==
11 November 2003

Cliftonville	1 – 1 (a.e.t.)	Larne
Mulvenna 79'	Report	Delaney 11'
Penalties
Fleming (penalty scored); Small (penalty scored); Quigley (penalty scored); Mulvenna (penalty scored); Hagan (penalty scored)	5 – 4	(penalty scored) Walsh; (penalty scored) Delaney; (penalty scored) Dickson; (penalty scored) McCloskey; (penalty missed) Maxwell

Windsor Park, Belfast
Attendance: 2,500
Referee: Frankie Hiles (Coleraine)
