= 1993–94 Irish League Cup =

Wilkinson Sword League Cup

Tournament details
- Country: Northern Ireland
- Teams: 32

Final positions
- Champions: Linfield (3rd win)
- Runners-up: Coleraine

Tournament statistics
- Matches played: 31
- Goals scored: 123 (3.97 per match)

The 1993–94 Irish League Cup (known as the Wilkinson Sword League Cup for sponsorship reasons) was the 8th edition of the Irish League Cup, Northern Ireland's secondary football knockout cup competition. It concluded on 26 April 1994 with the final.

Bangor unsuccessfully defended its 1993 title losing in the second round to Ards. Linfield would successfully defend its pursuit of a third title in the final by defeating Coleraine, 2-0. Coleraine were runners-up for its first set of consecutive seasons.

== First round ==
Team 1	Score	Team 2
Ards	9–2	Queen's University
Ballyclare Comrades	3–2	Harland & Wolff Welders
Ballymena United	0–0 (4–5 p)	Tobermore United
Bangor	1–0	Loughgall
Chimney Corner	0–4	Newry Town
Cliftonville	5–1	Brantwood
Coleraine	4–0	Dundela
Crusaders	5–0	Cookstown United
Distillery	2–1	Banbridge Town
Dungannon Swifts	0–2	Portadown
Glenavon	11–0	Ballinamallard United
Glentoran	5–2	Ballymoney United
Larne	4–2	Armagh City
Limavady United	4–2	Carrick Rangers
Linfield	5–0	Moyola Park
RUC	2–1	Omagh Town

== Second round ==
Team 1	Score	Team 2
Ballyclare Comrades	3–4	Glenavon
Bangor	1–3	Ards
Coleraine	2–1	Larne
Crusaders	4–0	Newry Town
Distillery	3–0	Tobermore United
Glentoran	2–0	Limavady United
Linfield	0–0 (5–4 p)	Cliftonville
Portadown	4–0	RUC

== Quarter-finals ==
Team 1	Score	Team 2
Coleraine	1–0	Glenavon
Crusaders	3–1	Portadown
Distillery	1–2	Ards
Linfield	2–1	Glentoran

== Semi-finals ==
Team 1	Score	Team 2
Coleraine	2–1	Ards
Linfield	1–0	Crusaders

== Final ==
26 April 1994

Linfield	2 – 0	Coleraine
Peebles 57'; Campbell 58'	Report

The Oval, Belfast
Referee: George Keatley (Bangor)
