= 1989–90 Irish League Cup =

Roadferry Freight League Cup

Tournament details
- Country: Northern Ireland
- Teams: 30

Final positions
- Champions: Glenavon (1st win)
- Runners-up: Newry Town

Tournament statistics
- Matches played: 29
- Goals scored: 120 (4.14 per match)

The 1989–90 Irish League Cup (known as the Roadferry Freight League Cup for sponsorship reasons) was the 4th edition of the Irish League Cup, Northern Ireland's secondary football knock-out cup competition. It concluded on 19 December 1989 with the final.

Glentoran unsuccessfully defended its 1989 title in the quarterfinal losing to Portadown. Portadown unsuccessfully defended its pursuit of the cup in the semifinals losing to Newry Town. Newry Town would unsuccessfully defend its pursuit of the title in the final losing to Glenavon, 3–1.

== First round ==
Ballyclare Comrades and Omagh Town both received byes into the second round.

Team 1	Score	Team 2
Ards	12–0	UUJ
Ballymena United	1–2 (aet)	Brantwood
Bangor	5–1	RUC
Carrick Rangers	4–2 (aet)	Dundela
Chimney Corner	0–8	Glentoran
Cliftonville	0–2	Harland & Wolff Welders
Coleraine	2–1	Queen's University
Crusaders	2–1 (aet)	Banbridge Town
Distillery	2–2 (6–7 p)	Limavady United
Glenavon	6–1	Tobermore United
Larne	3–2	UUC
Linfield	3–1	Dungannon Swifts
Newry Town	4–0	Ballymoney United
Portadown	4–0	Armagh City

== Second round ==
Team 1	Score	Team 2
Ards	2–2 (4–2 p)	Ballyclare Comrades
Bangor	2–1	Harland & Wolff Welders
Carrick Rangers	2–1	Omagh Town
Coleraine	3–0	Crusaders
Glenavon	4–0 (aet)	Limavady United
Linfield	0–4	Glentoran
Newry Town	3–1	Brantwood
Portadown	2–0 (aet)	Larne

== Quarter-finals ==
Team 1	Score	Team 2
Bangor	0–3	Glenavon
Coleraine	1–2 (aet)	Ards
Glentoran	0–1	Portadown
Newry Town	5–0	Carrick Rangers

== Semi-finals ==
Team 1	Score	Team 2
Glenavon	3–1	Ards
Portadown	0–2	Newry Town

== Final ==
19 December 1989

Glenavon	3 – 1	Newry Town
Ferris; Conville	Report	Hawkins

Windsor Park, Belfast
