= 1991–92 Irish League Cup =

Wilkinson Sword League Cup

Tournament details
- Country: Northern Ireland
- Teams: 32

Final positions
- Champions: Linfield (2nd win)
- Runners-up: Larne

Tournament statistics
- Matches played: 31
- Goals scored: 104 (3.35 per match)

The 1991–92 Irish League Cup (known as the Wilkinson Sword League Cup for sponsorship reasons) was the 6th edition of the Irish League Cup, Northern Ireland's secondary football knockout cup competition. It concluded on 14 April 1992 with the final.

Glentoran unsuccessfully defended its 1991 title in the first round losing to Harland & Wolff Welders. Linfield successfully defend in the final its pursuit of a second title defeating Larne, 3–0.

== First round ==
| Team 1 | Score | Team 2 |
|---|---|---|
| Ards | 5–0 | Queen's University |
| Ballyclare Comrades | 1–0 | Tobermore United |
| Ballymena United | 2–1 (aet) | Ballymoney United |
| Bangor | 0–2 | Dundela |
| Carrick Rangers | 2–1 | Moyola Park |
| Cliftonville | 4–0 | Banbridge Town |
| Coleraine | 5–4 | Limavady United |
| Crusaders | 3–0 | Brantwood |
| Distillery | 3–1 | Loughgall |
| Glenavon | 2–0 | Dungannon Swifts |
| Glentoran | 0–2 | Harland & Wolff Welders |
| Larne | 3–0 | Chimney Corner |
| Linfield | 3–1 | RUC |
| Newry Town | 3–1 | Armagh City |
| Omagh Town | 3–2 | Ballinamallard United |
| Portadown | 1–0 | Cookstown United |

== Second round ==
| Team 1 | Score | Team 2 |
|---|---|---|
| Ballyclare Comrades | 1–3 | Ards |
| Ballymena United | 3–0 | Newry Town |
| Coleraine | 0–2 | Dundela |
| Crusaders | 3–1 | Harland & Wolff Welders |
| Glenavon | 1–1 (3–5 p) | Cliftonville |
| Larne | 4–2 (aet) | Distillery |
| Omagh Town | 1–2 | Linfield |
| Portadown | 4–1 | Carrick Rangers |

== Quarter-finals ==
| Team 1 | Score | Team 2 |
|---|---|---|
| Ards | 0–2 | Portadown |
| Cliftonville | 4–1 (aet) | Dundela |
| Larne | 3–0 | Ballymena United |
| Linfield | 1–1 (3–1 p) | Crusaders |

== Semi-finals ==
| Team 1 | Score | Team 2 |
|---|---|---|
| Larne | 1–0 | Cliftonville |
| Linfield | 3–1 | Portadown |

== Final ==
14 April 1992

| Linfield | 3 – 0 | Larne |
|---|---|---|
| Hanna 16' (o.g.); McGaughey 73'; Hunter 90+5' | Report |

The Oval, Belfast
