= 2010–11 Irish League Cup =

Co-operative Insurance Cup

Tournament details
- Country: Northern Ireland
- Teams: 42

Final positions
- Champions: Lisburn Distillery (1st win)
- Runners-up: Portadown

Tournament statistics
- Matches played: 41
- Goals scored: 163 (3.98 per match)

The 2010–11 Irish League Cup (known as the Co-operative Insurance Cup for sponsorship reasons) was the 25th edition of the Irish League Cup, Northern Ireland's secondary football knock-out cup competition. For this season all matches reverted to a one-legged basis having previously been two-legged ties up until the semi-final stage. The competition was also opened up to include more clubs. It was contested by the 12 members of the IFA Premiership, as well as the 14 members of IFA Championship 1 and for the first time, the 16 members of IFA Championship 2 (the third tier). Glentoran were the defending champions.

Lisburn Distillery were the eventual winners, winning the competition for the first time with a 2–1 victory over Portadown in the final.

== First round ==
The games were played in a one-leg format on 21 August 2010.

Team #1	Score	Team #2
Ballyclare Comrades	1–1 (a.e.t.) (4–3 p)	Ballinamallard United
Carrick Rangers	2–0	Limavady United
Coagh United	0–3	Knockbreda Parish
Dundela	0–5	Institute
Glebe Rangers	5–1	Chimney Corner
Larne	5–1	Wakehurst
Loughgall	6–1	Ballymoney United
Lurgan Celtic	0–2	Ards
Moyola Park	3–0	Annagh United
PSNI	0–2	Warrenpoint Town

== Second round ==
These matches were played on 18 September 2010.

Team 1	Score	Team 2
Ards	3–1	Moyola Park
Armagh City	0–9	Lisburn Distillery
Banbridge Town	0–3	Ballymena United
Carrick Rangers	4–0	Bangor
Dergview	1–1 (a.e.t.) (1–4 p)	Dungannon Swifts
Glebe Rangers	2–5	Coleraine
Glenavon	5–1	Portstewart
Knockbreda Parish	0–7	Portadown
Larne	0–1	Cliftonville
Linfield	4–0	Killymoon Rangers
Loughgall	1–0	Ballyclare Comrades
Newry City	3–3 (a.e.t.) (3–2 p)	H&W Welders
Queen's University	0–5	Glentoran
Sport & Leisure Swifts	0–3	Institute
Tobermore United	2–4	Donegal Celtic
Warrenpoint Town	3–5	Crusaders

== Third round ==
These matches were played on 23 October 2010.

Team 1	Score	Team 2
Ballymena United	3–1	Ards
Coleraine	3–2	Donegal Celtic
Crusaders	2–1	Loughgall
Glentoran	5–1	Dungannon Swifts
Newry City	1–1 (a.e.t.) (4–3 p)	Linfield
Glenavon	1–2	Cliftonville
Portadown	2–1	Carrick Rangers
Institute	0–3	Lisburn Distillery

== Quarter-finals ==
These matches were played on 5 December 2010, 11 and 18 January 2011.

Team 1	Score	Team 2
Cliftonville	0–2	Glentoran
Ballymena United	0–2	Crusaders
Portadown	2–0	Coleraine
Lisburn Distillery	3–1	Newry City

== Semi-finals ==
1 February 2011
19:45 GMT

Lisburn Distillery	2–2	Crusaders
Liggett 73'; Cushley 100'	Report	Owens 74'; Rainey 101'
Penalties
	4–2

New Grosvenor Stadium, Ballyskeagh
Referee: Stephen Weatherall

2 February 2011
19:45 GMT

Glentoran	1–2 (a.e.t.)	Portadown
Clarke 26'	Report	Mackle 45'; Lecky 105'

The Oval, Belfast
Referee: Raymond Crangle

== Final ==
2 April 2011
14:30 GMT

Lisburn Distillery	2 – 1	Portadown
Davidson 51'; Cushley 88'	Report	Tipton 42'

Mourneview Park, Lurgan
Referee: Mark Courtney
