= 2016–17 Northern Ireland Football League Cup =

Tournament details
- Country: Northern Ireland
- Teams: 36

Final positions
- Champions: Ballymena United (1st win)
- Runners-up: Carrick Rangers

Tournament statistics
- Matches played: 35
- Goals scored: 151 (4.31 per match)

The 2016–17 Northern Ireland Football League Cup was the 31st edition of Northern Ireland's football knockout cup competition for national league clubs, and the third edition of the competition as the Northern Ireland Football League Cup. Following a reduction in the number of clubs in the three Northern Ireland Football League divisions, this season's League Cup was contested by 36 clubs - down from 40 last season. The competition began on 6 August 2016 with the first round, and concluded on 18 February 2017. For the first time in the competition's history, the League Cup did not have a title sponsor for this season.

For the fourth consecutive season Cliftonville were the defending champions, following their 3–0 win over Ards in the 2016 final. This secured the trophy for the fourth consecutive season and the fifth time overall. This season, their four-year grip on the Cup was finally broken by Glenavon, who defeated Cliftonville 3–2 after extra time in the quarter-finals. This inflicted Cliftonville's first League Cup defeat since December 2011, when they lost 2–1 to Coleraine in the semi-finals of the 2011–12 competition.

Ballymena United were the eventual winners of the Cup, defeating Carrick Rangers 2–0 in the final to win the competition for the first time. Ballymena United had been appearing in the final for the second time in three seasons, having been runners-up to Cliftonville in their first ever League Cup final appearance in the 2014–15 competition. Carrick Rangers were appearing in the final for the first time.

== Format and schedule ==
The competition was played in a straight knockout format and was open to the 36 members of the NIFL Premiership, NIFL Championship and NIFL Premier Intermediate League. Replays were not used in the competition, with all matches using extra time and penalties to determine the winner if necessary.

| Round | First match date | Fixtures | Clubs |
|---|---|---|---|
| First round | 6 August 2016 | 4 | 36 → 32 |
| Second round | 30 August 2016 | 16 | 32 → 16 |
| Third round | 12 October 2016 | 8 | 16 → 8 |
| Quarter-finals | 16 November 2016 | 4 | 8 → 4 |
| Semi-finals | 13 December 2016 | 2 | 4 → 2 |
| Final | 18 February 2017 | 1 | 2 → 1 |

== Results ==
The league tier of each club at the time of entering the competition is listed in parentheses.

=== First round ===
The matches took place on 6 August 2016.

| Team 1 | Score | Team 2 |
|---|---|---|
| Limavady United (3) | 2–1 (aet) | Queen's University (3) |
| Lurgan Celtic (2) | 1–1 (aet) (5–4p) | Bangor (3) |
| Moyola Park (3) | 1–3 | Institute (2) |
| PSNI (2) | 0–1 | Banbridge Town (3) |

=== Second round ===
The matches took place on 30 August 2016. The top 16 league clubs from the previous season were seeded in this round in order to avoid drawing each other.

| Team 1 | Score | Team 2 |
|---|---|---|
| Annagh United (2) | 3–2 | Glentoran (1) |
| Ards (1) | 3–1 | Newry City (2) |
| Armagh City (2) | 3–1 (aet) | Dergview (2) |
| Ballinamallard United (1) | 3–0 | Dundela (3) |
| Ballyclare Comrades (2) | 0–2 | Carrick Rangers (1) |
| Ballymena United (1) | 4–1 | Newington YC (3) |
| Cliftonville (1) | 11–1 | Lisburn Distillery (3) |
| Coleraine (1) | 3–0 | Limavady United (3) |
| Crusaders (1) | 3–1 | Loughgall (2) |
| Dungannon Swifts (1) | 6–2 | Sport & Leisure Swifts (3) |
| Glenavon (1) | 5–0 | Tobermore United (3) |
| Institute (2) | 0–2 (aet) | Harland & Wolff Welders (2) |
| Knockbreda (2) | 4–3 | Lurgan Celtic (2) |
| Linfield (1) | 5–0 | Larne (2) |
| Portadown (1) | 6–1 | Donegal Celtic (3) |
| Warrenpoint Town (2) | 4–2 (aet) | Banbridge Town (3) |

| Seeded | Unseeded |
|---|---|
| Ards; Armagh City; Ballinamallard United; Ballymena United; Carrick Rangers; Cliftonville; Coleraine; Crusaders; Dungannon Swifts; Glenavon; Glentoran; Harland & Wolff Welders; Knockbreda; Linfield; Portadown; Warrenpoint Town | Annagh United; Ballyclare Comrades; Banbridge Town; Dergview; Donegal Celtic; Dundela; Institute; Larne; Limavady United; Lisburn Distillery; Loughgall; Lurgan Celtic; Newington YC; Newry City; Sport & Leisure Swifts; Tobermore United |

=== Third round ===
The matches took place on 12 October 2016.

| Team 1 | Score | Team 2 |
|---|---|---|
| Annagh United (2) | 0–6 | Cliftonville (1) |
| Ards (1) | 2–4 (aet) | Warrenpoint Town (2) |
| Armagh City (2) | 0–2 | Carrick Rangers (1) |
| Ballymena United (1) | 4–1 | Linfield (1) |
| Coleraine (1) | 3–0 | Knockbreda (2) |
| Dungannon Swifts (1) | 6–1 | Ballinamallard United (1) |
| Glenavon (1) | 4–2 | Harland & Wolff Welders (2) |
| Portadown (1) | 3–4 | Crusaders (1) |

=== Quarter-finals ===
The matches took place on 16 November 2016.

| Team 1 | Score | Team 2 |
|---|---|---|
| Carrick Rangers (1) | 2–0 | Dungannon Swifts (1) |
| Coleraine (1) | 1–1 (aet) (5–4p) | Crusaders (1) |
| Glenavon (1) | 3–2 (aet) | Cliftonville (1) |
| Warrenpoint Town (2) | 0–2 | Ballymena United (1) |

=== Semi-finals ===
The matches took place on 13 December 2016.

| Team 1 | Score | Team 2 |
|---|---|---|
| Ballymena United (1) | 3–0 (aet) | Coleraine (1) |
| Glenavon (1) | 0–1 | Carrick Rangers (1) |

=== Final ===
The final was played on 18 February 2017 at Seaview.

18 February 2017
17:30 GMT

| Ballymena United (1) | 2 – 0 | Carrick Rangers (1) |
|---|---|---|
| Jenkins 44'; McCloskey 90+1' | NIFL |

Seaview, Belfast
Referee: Ian McNabb
