= 2000–01 Irish League Cup =

Coca-Cola League Cup

Tournament details
- Country: Northern Ireland
- Teams: 20

Final positions
- Champions: Glentoran (3rd win)
- Runners-up: Glenavon

Tournament statistics
- Matches played: 19
- Goals scored: 39 (2.05 per match)

The 2000–01 Irish League Cup (known as the Coca-Cola League Cup for sponsorship reasons) was the 15th edition of the Irish League Cup, Northern Ireland's secondary football knock-out cup competition. It concluded on 24 April 2001 with the final.

Linfield were the defending champions after their third consecutive and sixth overall League Cup win last season; a 4–0 victory over Coleraine in the previous final. This season they went out in the semi-finals to Glenavon, who condemned Linfield to their first defeat in the competition for four years. Glentoran were the eventual winners, defeating Glenavon 1–0 in the final to lift the cup for the third time overall, and the first time since the 1990–91 competition 10 years earlier.

== Preliminary round ==
Team 1	Score	Team 2
Carrick Rangers	1–0	Ballyclare Comrades
Dungannon Swifts	0–3	Limavady United
Larne	2–0	Bangor
Lisburn Distillery	0–2	Ards

== First round ==
Team 1	Score	Team 2
Armagh City	0–0 (4–3 p)	Coleraine
Ballymena United	1–2	Ards
Carrick Rangers	0–2	Glenavon
Cliftonville	2–3	Omagh Town
Crusaders	1–2	Linfield
Glentoran	2–1	Limavady United
Institute	2–2 (1–3 p)	Newry Town
Larne	0–1	Portadown

== Quarter-finals ==
Team 1	Score	Team 2
Ards	0–2	Omagh Town
Armagh City	0–1	Glentoran
Glenavon	3–0	Portadown
Newry Town	0–0 (3–4 p)	Linfield

== Semi-finals ==
Team 1	Score	Team 2
Omagh Town	0–2	Glentoran
Linfield	0–1	Glenavon

== Final ==
24 April 2001

Glenavon	0 – 1	Glentoran
	Report	Young 73' (pen.)

Windsor Park, Belfast
