= 2025–26 Northern Ireland Football League Cup =

BetMcLean League Cup

Tournament details
- Country: Northern Ireland
- Dates: 12 Aug 2025 – 15 Mar 2026
- Teams: 38

Final positions
- Champions: Linfield (13th title)
- Runners-up: Glentoran

Tournament statistics
- Matches played: 37
- Goals scored: 144 (3.89 per match)

The 2025–26 Northern Ireland Football League Cup (known as the BetMcLean Cup for sponsorship purposes) was the 39th edition of Northern Ireland's football knockout cup competition for national league clubs, and the tenth edition of the competition as the Northern Ireland Football League Cup. The competition was contested by the 38 member clubs of the Northern Ireland Football League, commencing on 12 August 2025 with the preliminary round and concluding with the final on 15 March 2026. The competition was sponsored by McLean Bookmakers, the title sponsors of the cup since the 2017–18 season.

Cliftonville F.C. were the defending champions, but were eliminated in the quarter-finals by Glentoran in a rematch of last season's final.

== Format and schedule ==
The competition is open to the 38 members of the Northern Ireland Football League (NIFL). The 14 NIFL Premier Intermediate League clubs entered the draw for the preliminary round, with 12 of those clubs being drawn to face each other in six ties and the remaining two clubs receiving byes.

The six preliminary round winners and the two clubs which received byes joined the remaining 24 clubs from the NIFL Premiership and NIFL Championship in the first round. The 16 highest-ranked clubs from the previous season's league system (all 12 NIFL Premiership clubs along with the top 4 NIFL Championship clubs) were then seeded in the first round to avoid drawing each other.

The first round is the only round of the competition in which seeding is used. From there on the competition used an open draw with a standard knockout format, with the remaining rounds consisting of the second round, quarter-finals, semi-finals and the final.

Replays are not used in the competition, with all matches using extra time and penalties to determine the winner if necessary.

Round	First match date	Fixtures	Clubs
Preliminary round	12 August 2025	6	38 → 32
First round	7 October 2025	16	32 → 16
Second round	4 November 2025	8	16 → 8
Quarter-finals	2 December 2025	4	8 → 4
Semi-finals	13 January 2026	2	4 → 2
Final	8 March 2026	1	2 → 1

== Rounds ==
The competition takes place over six rounds; a preliminary round and five rounds proper.

=== Preliminary round ===
Six preliminary ties featuring twelve teams from the third-tier 2025–26 NIFL Premier Intermediate League. Ties were played on 12 and 16 August 2025.

Team 1	Score	Team 2
Dergview	3–1	Rathfriland Rangers
Moyola Park	5–3	Portstewart
Ballyclare Comrades	1–2	Coagh United
Newry City	3–0	Knockbreda
Oxford Sunnyside	1–5	Ballymacash Rangers
Lisburn Distillery	3–2	Banbridge Town

=== First Round ===
The six preliminary round winners join the 12 NIFL Premiership (tier 1), 12 NIFL Championship (tier 2) and the remaining two intermediate teams in the First Round Proper. Ties to be played on 7 and 8 October 2025.

Team 1	Score	Team 2
Ards	1–1 (a.e.t.) (3–4 p)	Dungannon Swifts
Armagh City	3–2	Carrick Rangers
Ballymena United	1–0	Ballinamallard United
Bangor	4–1	Lisburn Distillery
Cliftonville	4–1	Coagh United
Crusaders	3–1	Ballymacash Rangers
Dergview	3–7	Larne
Dollingstown	0–8	Coleraine
H&W Welders	6–0	Dundela
Institute	0–1	Glentoran
Linfield	2–0	Queen's University
Loughgall	2–3 (a.e.t.)	Strabane Athletic
Moyola Park	3–0	Annagh United
Newington	3–1	Limavady United
Newry City	1–0	Portadown
Warrenpoint Town	0–2	Glenavon

=== Second round ===
Team 1	Score	Team 2
Ballymena United	3–0	Newington
Coleraine	7–1	Armagh City
Dunganon Swifts	0–1	Moyola Park
Glentoran	2–1	Crusaders
Larne	2–1	Bangor
Newry City	1–0	Glenavon
Cliftonville	5–2	Strabane Athletic
Harland & Wolff Welders	3–6 (a.e.t.)	Linfield

=== Quarter-finals ===
Team 1	Score	Team 2
Ballymena United	2–0	Larne
Glentoran	1–1 (a.e.t.) (5–4 p)	Cliftonville
Moyola Park	0–2	Coleraine
Newry City	2–3	Linfield

=== Semi-finals ===
Team 1	Score	Team 2
Linfield	1 – 0	Ballymena Utd
Glentoran	2 – 1	Coleraine

=== BetMcClean NI League Cup final ===
15 March 2026
15:00 GMT

Linfield	1–0 (a.e.t.)	Glentoran
McKee 117' (pen.)	Report

Windsor Park, Belfast
Attendance: 12,297
Referee: Ben McMaster
