= 1992–93 Irish League Cup =

Wilkinson Sword League Cup

Tournament details
- Country: Northern Ireland
- Teams: 32

Final positions
- Champions: Bangor (1st win)
- Runners-up: Coleraine

Tournament statistics
- Matches played: 31
- Goals scored: 106 (3.42 per match)

The 1992–93 Irish League Cup (known as the Wilkinson Sword League Cup for sponsorship reasons) was the 7th edition of the Irish League Cup, Northern Ireland's secondary football knock-out cup competition. It concluded on 20 April 1993 with the final.

Linfield unsuccessfully defended its 1992 title in the semifinals to Bangor. Bangor would successfully defend its pursuit of its first and only appearance in the final, 3-0, defeating Coleraine.

== First round ==
Team 1	Score	Team 2
Ards	4–0	Banbridge Town
Ballyclare Comrades	2–1	Limavady United
Ballymena United	7–0	Chimney Corner
Bangor	7–0	Harland & Wolff Welders
Carrick Rangers	3–1	Moyola Park
Cliftonville	3–0	Queen's University
Coleraine	1–1 (5–4 p)	Ballymoney United
Crusaders	2–3	RUC
Distillery	2–0	Ballinamallard United
Glenavon	1–1 (6–5 p)	Dungannon Swifts
Glentoran	3–2	Dundela
Larne	2–0	Tobermore United
Linfield	4–0	Brantwood
Newry Town	1–1 (6–5 p)	Armagh City
Omagh Town	3–0	Loughgall
Portadown	5–0	Cookstown United

== Second round ==
Team 1	Score	Team 2
Ballyclare Comrades	1–1 (6–5 p)	Glenavon
Cliftonville	1–1 (2–4 p)	Ballymena United
Distillery	2–0	RUC
Glentoran	3–2 (aet)	Carrick Rangers
Larne	2–4	Ards
Newry Town	3–4	Bangor
Omagh Town	0–1	Linfield
Portadown	2–2 (4–5 p)	Coleraine

== Quarter-finals ==
Team 1	Score	Team 2
Ballymena United	0–2	Bangor
Distillery	1–2	Ards
Glentoran	1–1 (3–5 p)	Coleraine
Linfield	3–0	Ballyclare Comrades

== Semi-finals ==
Team 1	Score	Team 2
Bangor	1–0	Linfield
Coleraine	2–1	Ards

== Final ==
20 April 1993

Bangor	3 – 0	Coleraine
McEvoy 22'; Brown 35'; Glendinning 62'	Report

Windsor Park, Belfast
Attendance: 2,000
