= 1988–89 Irish League Cup =

Roadferry Freight League Cup

Tournament details
- Country: Northern Ireland
- Teams: 32

Final positions
- Champions: Glentoran (1st win)
- Runners-up: Linfield

Tournament statistics
- Matches played: 31
- Goals scored: 120 (3.87 per match)

The 1988–89 Irish League Cup (known as the Roadferry Freight League Cup for sponsorship reasons) was the 3rd edition of the Irish League Cup, Northern Ireland's secondary football knockout cup competition. It concluded on 30 November 1988 with the final.

Coleraine unsuccessfully defended its 1988 title in the second round losing to Portadown. Portadown unsuccessfully defended its pursuit of the cup in the semifinals losing to Glentoran. Glentoran unsuccessfully defended its pursuit of the cup in the final losing to arch-rivals Linfield, 2–1.

The final was notable for the Glentoran goalkeeper Alan Paterson, scoring what turned out to be the winning goal. This was the first time that a goalkeeper had ever scored in a British football final.

== First round ==
Team 1	Score	Team 2
Ballymena United	2–0	Armagh City
Ballymena United II	1–2	Brantwood
Banbridge Town	1–3	Bangor
Chimney Corner	1–1 (3–4 p)	Ards
Cliftonville	5–2	Ballyclare Comrades
Coleraine	4–3	Ballymoney United
Crusaders	1–0	Harland & Wolff Welders
Distillery	2–0	UUJ
Glenavon	1–0	RUC
Glentoran	5–0	Limavady United
Larne	0–2	Dundela
Linfield	3–0	UUC
Linfield Swifts	8–2	Tobermore United
Newry Town	3–3 (6–8 p)	Dungannon Swifts
Omagh Town	3–3 (5–3 p)	Carrick Rangers
Portadown	4–1	Queen's University

== Second round ==
Team 1	Score	Team 2
Bangor	4–3	Dungannon Swifts
Brantwood	0–2	Dundela
Cliftonville	1–0	Ballymena United
Coleraine	1–1 (1–3 p)	Portadown
Crusaders	2–1	Distillery
Glenavon	5–2 (aet)	Ards
Glentoran	6–0	Omagh Town
Linfield Swifts	1–4	Linfield

== Quarter-finals ==
Team 1	Score	Team 2
Bangor	0–1	Glentoran
Cliftonville	0–3	Linfield (played at Windsor Park)
Glenavon	3–1	Crusaders
Portadown	1–0 (aet)	Dundela

== Semi-finals ==
Team 1	Score	Team 2
Glentoran	3–2	Portadown
Linfield	3–1	Glenavon

== Final ==
30 November 1988

Glentoran	2 – 1	Linfield
McCartney; Paterson	Report	Mooney

The Oval, Belfast
