= 2006–07 Irish League Cup =

CIS Insurance Cup

Tournament details
- Country: Northern Ireland
- Teams: 16

Final positions
- Champions: Glentoran (6th win)
- Runners-up: Cliftonville

Tournament statistics
- Matches played: 55
- Goals scored: 157 (2.85 per match)

The 2006–07 Irish League Cup (known as the CIS Insurance Cup for sponsorship reasons) was the 21st edition of the Irish League Cup, Northern Ireland's secondary football knock-out cup competition. It concluded on 2 December 2006 with the final.

Linfield were the defending champions after their eighth League Cup win last season; a 3–0 victory over Glentoran in the previous final. This season Glentoran gained some revenge by defeating the Blues at the semi-final stage. The Glens went on to lift the cup for the sixth time by defeating Cliftonville 1–0 in the final. This was the ninth time in ten years that the cup had been won by one of Belfast's Big Two.

The 16 clubs taking part were divided into four groups of four clubs. The clubs in each group played each other at home and away. The top two clubs from each group then advanced to the quarter-finals where they played a single knock-out tie against another quarter-finalist. The semi-finals were played in the same format with the two winners of the ties advancing to the single match final.

== Group stage ==
=== Group A ===
Team	Pld	W	D	L	GF	GA	GD	Pts	GLT	NEW	LGL	DGC
Glentoran (A)	6	5	0	1	18	3	+15	15		3–0	4–0	5–0
Newry City (A)	6	4	1	1	11	7	+4	13	2–1		0–0	2–1
Loughgall	6	1	2	3	5	13	−8	5	0–2	1–5		2–2
Donegal Celtic	6	0	1	5	5	16	−11	1	1–3	1–2	0–2	

Source: rsssf.com
(A) Advanced to quarter-finals

=== Group B ===
Team	Pld	W	D	L	GF	GA	GD	Pts	CRU	POR	LIM	BYM
Crusaders (A)	6	4	1	1	8	5	+3	13		1–0	3–1	2–1
Portadown (A)	6	2	2	2	9	7	+2	8	2–0		2–2	3–1
Limavady United	6	1	3	2	11	13	−2	6	1–2	2–2		2–1
Ballymena United	6	1	2	3	7	10	−3	5	0–0	1–0	3–3	

Source: rsssf.com
(A) Advanced to quarter-finals

=== Group C ===
Team	Pld	W	D	L	GF	GA	GD	Pts	LIN	LIS	LRN	GLA
Linfield (A)	6	5	0	1	19	7	+12	15		4–1	3–2	5–1
Lisburn Distillery (A)	6	3	1	2	7	8	−1	10	0–3		1–0	3–0
Larne	6	2	1	3	7	8	−1	7	1–3	1–1		1–0
Glenavon	6	1	0	5	3	13	−10	3	2–1	0–1	0–2	

Source: rsssf.com
(A) Advanced to quarter-finals

=== Group D ===
Team	Pld	W	D	L	GF	GA	GD	Pts	CLI	DUN	COL	ARM
Cliftonville (A)	6	3	3	0	8	3	+5	12		0–0	3–2	3–0
Dungannon Swifts (A)	6	3	2	1	6	4	+2	11	0–0		3–2	2–0
Coleraine	6	2	1	3	12	9	+3	7	1–1	0–1		4–0
Armagh City	6	1	0	5	3	13	−10	3	0–1	2–0	1–3	

Source: rsssf.com
(A) Advanced to quarter-finals

== Quarter-finals ==
Team 1	Score	Team 2
Cliftonville	3–1	Lisburn Distillery
Crusaders	8–0	Newry City
Glentoran	1–1 (5–4 p)	Portadown
Linfield	2–0	Dungannon Swifts

== Semi-finals ==
Team 1	Score	Team 2
Cliftonville	1–0	Crusaders
Linfield	0–0 (3–4 p)	Glentoran

== Final ==
2 December 2006

Glentoran	1 – 0	Cliftonville
Hamilton 31'	Report

Windsor Park, Belfast
