= 1990–91 Irish League Cup =

Roadferry Freight League Cup

Tournament details
- Country: Northern Ireland
- Teams: 32

Final positions
- Champions: Glentoran (2nd win)
- Runners-up: Ards

Tournament statistics
- Matches played: 31
- Goals scored: 123 (3.97 per match)

The 1990–91 Irish League Cup (known as the Roadferry Freight League Cup for sponsorship reasons) was the 5th edition of the Irish League Cup, Northern Ireland's secondary football knockout cup competition. It concluded on 13 March 1991 with the final.

Glenavon unsuccessfully defended its 1990 title in the second round, losing to Larne. Larne would unsuccessfully defend its pursuit of the cup in the quarter final losing to Ards. Glentoran successfully defended its pursuit of the cup defeating Ards in the final, 2–0. Glentoran became the first to earn successive titles.

== First round ==
Team 1	Score	Team 2
Ards	4–1	Ballinamallard United
Ballyclare Comrades	5–5 (4–5 p)	RUC
Ballymena United	2–1 (aet)	Chimney Corner
Bangor	2–0	UUJ
Carrick Rangers	1–2	Dundela
Cliftonville	4–0	Tobermore United
Coleraine	0–1	Queen's University
Crusaders	2–1	Brantwood
Distillery	2–1	Ballymoney United
Glenavon	6–0	UUC
Glentoran	1–0	Banbridge Town
Larne	4–0	Dungannon Swifts
Linfield	4–0	Cookstown United
Newry Town	5–0	Harland & Wolff Welders
Omagh Town	5–0	Limavady United
Portadown	1–2	Armagh City

== Second round ==
Team 1	Score	Team 2
Ards	3–0	Queen's University
Bangor	3–0	Armagh City
Cliftonville	1–2	RUC
Crusaders	1–2	Distillery
Glentoran	4–2	Ballymena United
Larne	2–1 (aet)	Glenavon
Newry Town	2–4	Linfield
Omagh Town	2–1	Dundela

== Quarter-finals ==
Team 1	Score	Team 2
Ards	4–0	Larne
Bangor	3–0	RUC
Glentoran	4–0	Distillery
Linfield	2–3 (aet)	Omagh Town

== Semi-finals ==
Team 1	Score	Team 2
Ards	4–1	Omagh Town
Bangor	2–6	Glentoran

== Final ==
20 March 1991

Glentoran	2 – 0	Ards
Macartney 46', 67'	Report

Windsor Park, Belfast
