= 2023–24 Northern Ireland Football League Cup =

BetMcLean League Cup

Tournament details
- Country: Northern Ireland
- Dates: 19 Aug 2023 – 10 Mar 2024
- Teams: 38

Final positions
- Champions: Linfield (12th title)
- Runners-up: Portadown

Tournament statistics
- Matches played: 37
- Goals scored: 136 (3.68 per match)

The 2023–24 Northern Ireland Football League Cup (known as the BetMcLean Cup for sponsorship purposes) was the 37th edition of Northern Ireland's football knockout cup competition for national league clubs, and the ninth edition of the competition as the Northern Ireland Football League Cup. The competition was contested by the 38 member clubs of the Northern Ireland Football League, commencing on 19 August 2023 with the preliminary round and concluding with the final on 10 March 2024. The competition was sponsored by McLean Bookmakers, the title sponsors of the cup since the 2017–18 season.

Linfield were the defending champions after defeating Coleraine 2–0 in the 2023 final to win the competition for a record 11th time. This season, Linfield successfully retained the cup following a 3–1 victory over second-tier side Portadown in the final. This was Linfield's 12th League Cup win, further extending their record.

== Format and schedule ==
The competition was open to the 38 members of the Northern Ireland Football League (NIFL). The 14 NIFL Premier Intermediate League clubs entered the draw for the preliminary round, with 12 of those clubs being drawn to face each other in six ties and the remaining two clubs receiving byes. The 6 preliminary round winners and the two clubs which received byes joined the remaining 24 clubs from the NIFL Premiership and NIFL Championship in the first round. The 16 highest-ranked clubs from the previous season's league system (all 12 NIFL Premiership clubs along with the top 4 NIFL Championship clubs) were then seeded in the first round to avoid drawing each other. The first round was the only round of the competition in which seeding is used. From there on the competition used an open draw with a standard knockout format, with the remaining rounds consisting of the second round, quarter-finals, semi-finals and the final. Replays were not used in the competition, with all matches using extra time and penalties to determine the winner if necessary.

Round	First match date	Fixtures	Clubs
Preliminary round	19 August 2023	6	38 → 32
First round	3 October 2023	16	32 → 16
Second round	7 November 2023	8	16 → 8
Quarter-finals	5 December 2023	4	8 → 4
Semi-finals	16 January 2024	2	4 → 2
Final	10 March 2024	1	2 → 1

== Results ==
The league tier of each club at the time of entering the competition is listed in parentheses.

(1) = NIFL Premiership
(2) = NIFL Championship
(3) = NIFL Premier Intermediate League

=== Preliminary round ===
The Preliminary round draw was made on 21 July 2023. The matches were played on 19 and 29 August 2023.

Team 1	Score	Team 2
19 August 2023
Banbridge Town (3)	0–1	**Coagh United (3)**
**Limavady United (3)**	6–1	Tobermore United (3)
29 August 2023
Ballymacash Rangers (3)	1–4	**Lisburn Distillery (3)**
**Dollingstown (3)**	2–1	Armagh City (3)
PSNI (3)	0–1	**Moyola Park (3)**
**Portstewart (3)**	1–1 (a.e.t.) (5–4 p)	Rathfriland Rangers (3)

=== First round ===
The First round draw was made on 4 September 2023. The matches were played on 3 October 2023. The top 16 league clubs from the previous season were seeded in this round in order to avoid drawing each other.

Team 1	Score	Team 2
**Annagh United (2)**	4–1 (a.e.t.)	Portstewart (3)
Ballinamallard United (2)	1–5	**Ards (2)**
**Ballymena United (1)**	4–0	Lisburn Distillery (3)
**Carrick Rangers (1)**	4–1	Moyola Park (3)
**Cliftonville (1)**	3–0	Institute (2)
**Coleraine (1)**	2–1 (a.e.t.)	Bangor (2)
**Dungannon Swifts (1)**	3–1	Newington (2)
**Glenavon (1)**	2–1 (a.e.t.)	Dergview (2)
**Glentoran (1)**	2–0	Dollingstown (3)
Harland & Wolff Welders (2)	1–2	**Newry City (1)**
**Larne (1)**	9–1	Knockbreda (2)
**Limavady United (3)**	2–0	Dundela (2)
**Linfield (1)**	3–1	Queen's University (3)
**Loughgall (1)**	3–2	Ballyclare Comrades (2)
**Portadown (2)**	4–1	Coagh United (3)
Warrenpoint Town (3)	0–5	**Crusaders (1)**

Seeded	Unseeded
**Annagh United (2)**; **Ards (2)**; **Ballymena United (1)**; **Carrick Rangers (1)**; **Cliftonville (1)**; **Coleraine (1)**; **Crusaders (1)**; Dundela (2); **Dungannon Swifts (1)**; **Glenavon (1)**; **Glentoran (1)**; **Larne (1)**; **Linfield (1)**; **Loughgall (1)**; **Newry City (1)**; **Portadown (2)**	Ballinamallard United (2); Ballyclare Comrades (2); Bangor (2); Coagh United (3); Dergview (2); Dollingstown (3); Harland & Wolff Welders (2); Institute (2); Knockbreda (2); **Limavady United (3)**; Lisburn Distillery (3); Moyola Park (3); Newington (2); Portstewart (3); Queen's University (3); Warrenpoint Town (3)
Clubs in **bold** = Second round winners

=== Second round ===
The Second round draw was made on 5 October 2023. The matches were played on 7, 21 and 28 November 2023.

Team 1	Score	Team 2
7 November 2023
Ards (2)	3–5 (a.e.t.)	**Larne (1)**
Ballymena United (1)	1–1 (a.e.t.) (17–18 p)	**Coleraine (1)**
Carrick Rangers (1)	2–2 (a.e.t.) (1–3 p)	**Newry City (1)**
**Dungannon Swifts (1)**	1–0	Cliftonville (1)
Glentoran (1)	1–2	**Linfield (1)**
**Portadown (2)**	2–1	Crusaders (1)
21 November 2023
Annagh United (2)	0–1	**Loughgall (1)**
28 November 2023
Limavady United (3)	0–1	**Glenavon (1)**

=== Quarter-finals ===
The quarter-final and semi-final draws were both made on 8 November 2023. The quarter-finals were played on 5 and 12 December 2023.

Team 1	Score	Team 2
5 December 2023
Coleraine (1)	2–3	**Glenavon (1)**
Larne (1)	2–2 (a.e.t.) (2–3 p)	**Linfield (1)**
**Portadown (2)**	2–0	Loughgall (1)
12 December 2023
**Dungannon Swifts (1)**	4–2 (a.e.t.)	Newry City (1)

=== Semi-finals ===
The semi-final matches were played on 16 January 2024.

Team 1	Score	Team 2
Dungannon Swifts (1)	1–2	**Linfield (1)**
Glenavon (1)	0–1	**Portadown (2)**

=== Final ===
The final was played on 10 March 2024 at Windsor Park, Belfast. This was the third consecutive season that the final was played on a Sunday. Linfield and Portadown met in the final for the first time. This was a record-extending 15th final appearance for Linfield, who, as defending champions, appeared in the final for the second successive season. Portadown appeared in the final for the fifth time overall and the first time since 2011. This marked only the third time in the cup's history that a club from outside the top flight had reached the final, with Portadown themselves having won the cup in 2009 while playing in the second tier - the only time this feat has been achieved. In 2016, Ards also reached the final while playing in the second tier, but lost 3–0 against Cliftonville. Linfield successfully retained the cup following a 3–1 victory in the final.

10 March 2024
15:00 GMT

Linfield (1)	3 – 1	Portadown (2)
Hall 40'; Wilson 45' (o.g.); Annett 56'		Fyfe 75'

Windsor Park, Belfast
Attendance: 9,179
Referee: Tony Clarke
