= 1995–96 Irish League Cup =

Wilkinson Sword League Cup

Tournament details
- Country: Northern Ireland
- Teams: 32

Final positions
- Champions: Portadown (1st win)
- Runners-up: Crusaders

Tournament statistics
- Matches played: 31
- Goals scored: 94 (3.03 per match)

The 1995–96 Irish League Cup (known as the Wilkinson Sword League Cup for sponsorship reasons) was the 10th edition of the Irish League Cup, Northern Ireland's secondary football knockout cup competition. It concluded on 19 September 1995 with the final.

Ards unsuccessfully defended its 1995 title in the second round losing to Coleraine. Portadown successfully pursued its first title in the final, defeating Crusaders, 2-1.

== First round ==
Team 1	Score	Team 2
Ards	2–0	Queen's University
Armagh City	2–3	Crusaders
Ballyclare Comrades	0–1	Banbridge Town
Carrick Rangers	1–0	Cookstown United
Chimney Corner	0–1	Ballymena United
Cliftonville	5–0	Limavady United
Coleraine	3–1	Ballinamallard United
Distillery	0–1	Harland & Wolff Welders
Dundela	0–1	Portadown
Dungannon Swifts	1–2	Bangor
Glenavon	5–0	Moyola Park
Glentoran	3–0	Brantwood
Larne	3–0	Ballymoney United
Linfield	6–0	RUC
Loughgall	3–4 (aet)	Omagh Town
Newry Town	2–0	Tobermore United

== Second round ==
Team 1	Score	Team 2
Ards	1–2	Coleraine
Ballymena United	0–4	Portadown
Carrick Rangers	2–0	Banbridge Town
Cliftonville	6–1	Bangor
Crusaders	1–0	Harland & Wolff Welders
Glentoran	0–1	Linfield
Larne	0–1	Glenavon
Omagh Town	3–1	Newry Town

== Quarter-finals ==
Team 1	Score	Team 2
Carrick Rangers	2–6	Omagh Town
Cliftonville	0–0 (0–3 p)	Crusaders
Coleraine	0–3	Glenavon
Portadown	0–0 (5–4 p)	Linfield

== Semi-finals ==
Team 1	Score	Team 2
Crusaders	3–1	Omagh Town
Portadown	3–0	Glenavon

== Final ==
19 September 1995

Crusaders	1 – 2	Portadown
Burrows 79'	Report	Haylock 50'; Casey 83'

Windsor Park, Belfast
Referee: Leslie Irvine (Limavady)
