= 2001–02 Irish League Cup =

CIS Insurance Cup

Tournament details
- Country: Northern Ireland
- Teams: 20

Final positions
- Champions: Linfield (7th win)
- Runners-up: Glentoran

Tournament statistics
- Matches played: 49
- Goals scored: 124 (2.53 per match)

The 2001–02 Irish League Cup (known as the CIS Insurance Cup for sponsorship reasons) was the 16th edition of the Irish League Cup, Northern Ireland's secondary football knock-out cup competition. It concluded on 27 November 2001 with the final.

Glentoran were the defending champions after their third League Cup win last season; a 1–0 victory over Glenavon in the previous final. This season they reached the final again but were defeated 3–1 by arch-rivals Linfield, who won their seventh League Cup overall, and fourth in five years. This was also the third time in five years that the two clubs had met in the final, with Linfield coming out on top on all three occasions.

The competition had a major reform this season. The twenty clubs taking part were divided into four groups of five clubs based on region. The clubs in each group played each other once, either at home or away. The top two clubs from each group then advanced to the quarter-finals where they played a single knock-out tie against another quarter-finalist. The semi-finals were played in a home and away two-legged aggregate score format with the two winners of the ties advancing to the single match final.

== Group stage ==
=== Eastern Region ===
Team	Pld	W	D	L	GF	GA	GD	Pts	CRK	CRU	CLI	BCC	LRN
Carrick Rangers (A)	4	3	1	0	8	1	+7	10		2–0		4–0	
Crusaders (A)	4	3	0	1	5	3	+2	9			2–0		1–0
Cliftonville	4	2	1	1	5	3	+2	7	0–0			2–1	
Ballyclare Comrades	4	1	0	3	3	8	−5	3		1–2			1–0
Larne	4	0	0	4	1	7	−6	0	1–2		0–3		

Source: rsssf.com
Legend: Blue = home team win; Yellow = draw; Red = away team win.
(A) Advanced to quarter-finals

=== Greater Belfast Region ===
Team	Pld	W	D	L	GF	GA	GD	Pts	LIN	GLT	LIS	ARD	BGR
Linfield (A)	4	2	2	0	10	3	+7	8		0–0	3–3		3–0
Glentoran (A)	4	2	2	0	4	0	+4	8				2–0	2–0
Lisburn Distillery	4	0	4	0	4	4	0	4		0–0			1–1
Ards	4	1	1	2	3	8	−5	4	0–4		0–0		
Bangor	4	0	1	3	3	9	−6	1				2–3	

Source: rsssf.com
Legend: Blue = home team win; Yellow = draw; Red = away team win.
(A) Advanced to quarter-finals

=== Northern Region ===
Team	Pld	W	D	L	GF	GA	GD	Pts	INS	COL	BYM	LIM	OMA
Institute (A)	4	4	0	0	7	0	+7	12		2–0	2–0		
Coleraine (A)	4	3	0	1	8	2	+6	9			5–0	1–0	
Ballymena United	4	2	0	2	4	9	−5	6				2–1	2–1
Limavady United	4	1	0	3	2	6	−4	3	0–2				1–0
Omagh Town	4	0	0	4	1	5	−4	0	0–1	0–1			

Source: rsssf.com
Legend: Blue = home team win; Yellow = draw; Red = away team win.
(A) Advanced to quarter-finals

=== Southern Region ===
Team	Pld	W	D	L	GF	GA	GD	Pts	NEW	GLA	ARM	POR	DUN
Newry Town (A)	4	3	0	1	8	5	+3	9		3–1		3–1	
Glenavon (A)	4	2	1	1	6	5	+1	7					
Armagh City	4	1	2	1	3	2	+1	5	2–0	0–0		0–1	
Portadown	4	1	1	2	3	6	−3	4		1–3			0–0
Dungannon Swifts	4	0	2	2	3	5	−2	2	1–2	1–2	1–1		

Source: rsssf.com
Legend: Blue = home team win; Yellow = draw; Red = away team win.
(A) Advanced to quarter-finals

== Quarter-finals ==
Team 1	Score	Team 2
Carrick Rangers	2–0	Institute
Crusaders	1–3	Coleraine
Glentoran	3–2	Glenavon
Linfield	3–1	Newry Town

== Semi-finals ==
Team 1	Agg.	Team 2	1st leg	2nd leg
Glentoran	8–1	Carrick Rangers	3–1	5–0
Coleraine	2–3	Linfield	0–2	2–1

== Final ==
27 November 2001

Linfield	3 – 1	Glentoran
Morgan 16'; Gorman 36'; Kelly 81'	Report	Haylock 79'

Windsor Park, Belfast
