= 2022–23 Northern Ireland Football League Cup =

BetMcLean League Cup

Tournament details
- Country: Northern Ireland
- Dates: 6 Aug 2022 – 12 Mar 2023
- Teams: 36

Final positions
- Champions: Linfield (11th win)
- Runners-up: Coleraine

Tournament statistics
- Matches played: 35
- Goals scored: 133 (3.8 per match)

The 2022–23 Northern Ireland Football League Cup (known as the BetMcLean Cup for sponsorship purposes) was the 36th edition of Northern Ireland's football knockout cup competition for national league clubs, and the eighth edition of the competition as the Northern Ireland Football League Cup. The competition was contested by the 36 member clubs of the Northern Ireland Football League, commencing on 6 August 2022 with the preliminary round and concluding with the final on 12 March 2023. The competition was sponsored by McLean Bookmakers, the title sponsors of the cup since the 2017–18 season.

Cliftonville were the defending champions, following a 4–3 win over Coleraine after extra time in the 2022 final to win the cup for the sixth time overall. However, this season they were eliminated by the same opponents in the semi-finals. Linfield were the eventual winners, after they defeated Coleraine 2–0 in the final to win the competition for a record-extending 11th time overall, their first win since the 2019 final. Coleraine finished as runners-up for the second consecutive season after their seventh defeat in a League Cup final overall. This set a new record in the competition for the most defeats in a final.

== Format and schedule ==
The competition was open to the 36 members of the Northern Ireland Football League (NIFL). The eight lowest-ranked clubs from the previous season's league system (the clubs that finished 5th–11th in the NIFL Premier Intermediate League along with the newly promoted club, Ballymacash Rangers) entered the preliminary round, with the 4 winners joining the remaining 28 NIFL clubs in the first round. The 16 highest-ranked clubs from the previous season's league system (all 12 NIFL Premiership clubs along with the top 4 NIFL Championship clubs) were then seeded in the first round to avoid drawing each other. The first round was the only round of the competition in which seeding is used. From there on the competition used an open draw with a standard knockout format, with the remaining rounds consisting of the second round, quarter-finals, semi-finals and the final. Replays were not used in the competition, with all matches using extra time and penalties to determine the winner if necessary.

Round	First match date	Fixtures	Clubs
Preliminary round	6 August 2022	4	36 → 32
First round	13 September 2022	16	32 → 16
Second round	4 October 2022	8	16 → 8
Quarter-finals	1 November 2022	4	8 → 4
Semi-finals	6 December 2022	2	4 → 2
Final	12 March 2023	1	2 → 1

== Results ==
The league tier of each club at the time of entering the competition is listed in parentheses.

(1) = NIFL Premiership
(2) = NIFL Championship
(3) = NIFL Premier Intermediate League

=== Preliminary round ===
The Preliminary round draw was made on 21 July 2022. The matches were played on 6 August and 9 August 2022.

Team 1	Score	Team 2
6 August 2022
**Dollingstown (3)**	2–1	Ballymacash Rangers (3)
**Lisburn Distillery (3)**	2–1	PSNI (3)
Tobermore United (3)	1–3	**Banbridge Town (3)**
9 August 2022
**Moyola Park (3)**	4–1 (a.e.t.)	Portstewart (3)

=== First round ===
The First round draw was made on 20 August 2022. The matches were played on 13 and 14 September 2022. The top 16 league clubs from the previous season were seeded in this round in order to avoid drawing each other.

Team 1	Score	Team 2
13 September 2022
**Ballyclare Comrades (2)**	4–2 (a.e.t.)	Ballinamallard United (2)
Bangor (3)	0–4	**Annagh United (2)**
**Carrick Rangers (1)**	5–0	Banbridge Town (3)
**Coleraine (1)**	4–0	Dergview (2)
**Dundela (2)**	2–1	Crusaders (1)
**Dungannon Swifts (1)**	3–0	Queen's University (3)
**Glenavon (1)**	6–0	Dollingstown (3)
**Glentoran (1)**	7–0	Institute (2)
Harland & Wolff Welders (2)	0–3	**Cliftonville (1)**
**Larne (1)**	5–1	Lisburn Distillery (3)
Limavady United (3)	0–0 (a.e.t.) (4–5 p)	**Newry City (1)**
**Loughgall (2)**	5–0	Knockbreda (2)
Moyola Park (3)	1–5	**Linfield (1)**
**Portadown (1)**	5–0	Armagh City (3)
**Warrenpoint Town (2)**	1–0	Newington (2)
14 September 2021
Ards (2)	2–4 (a.e.t.)	**Ballymena United (1)**

Seeded	Unseeded
**Annagh United (2)**; Ballinamallard United (2); **Ballymena United (1)**; **Carrick Rangers (1)**; **Cliftonville (1)**; **Coleraine (1)**; Crusaders (1); **Dungannon Swifts (1)**; **Glenavon (1)**; **Glentoran (1)**; **Larne (1)**; **Linfield (1)**; **Loughgall (2)**; **Newry City (1)**; **Portadown (1)**; **Warrenpoint Town (2)**	Ards (2); Armagh City (3); **Ballyclare Comrades (2)**; Banbridge Town (3); Bangor (3); Dergview (2); Dollingstown (3); **Dundela (2)**; Harland & Wolff Welders (2); Institute (2); Knockbreda (2); Limavady United (3); Lisburn Distillery (3); Moyola Park (3); Newington (2); Portstewart (3)
Clubs in **bold** = Second round winners

=== Second round ===
The Second round draw was made on 17 September 2022. The matches were played on 4 October 2022.

Team 1	Score	Team 2
4 October 2022
**Annagh United (2)**	2–1	Larne (1)
Ballyclare Comrades (2)	1–2	**Newry City (1)**
Ballymena United (1)	0–1	**Coleraine (1)**
**Cliftonville (1)**	6–0	Carrick Rangers (1)
Dundela (2)	0–1	**Linfield (1)**
**Dungannon Swifts (1)**	2–1 (a.e.t.)	Portadown (1)
Glenavon (1)	1–2	**Loughgall (2)**
**Glentoran (1)**	6–0	Warrenpoint Town (2)

=== Quarter-finals ===
The draw was made on 12 October 2022. The quarter-finals were played on 1 November 2022.

Team 1	Score	Team 2
**Cliftonville (1)**	3–2	Newry City (1)
**Coleraine (1)**	3–0	Dungannon Swifts (1)
**Linfield (1)**	3–0	Annagh United (2)
Loughgall (2)	0–2	**Glentoran (1)**

=== Semi-finals ===
The semi-final matches were played on 6 December 2022.

Team 1	Score	Team 2
Cliftonville (1)	2–2 (a.e.t.) (4–5 p)	**Coleraine (1)**
Glentoran (1)	0–3	**Linfield (1)**

=== Final ===
The final was played on 12 March 2023 at Windsor Park, Belfast. This was the second consecutive season that the League Cup final was played on a Sunday.

12 March 2023
15:00 GMT

Linfield (1)	2–0	Coleraine (1)
Cooper 49'; Shields 60' (pen.)	Report

Windsor Park, Belfast
Attendance: 11,038
Referee: Lee Tavinder
