= 1986–87 Irish League Cup =

Roadferry Freight League Cup

Tournament details
- Country: Northern Ireland
- Teams: 32

Final positions
- Champions: Linfield (1st win)
- Runner-up: Crusaders

Tournament statistics
- Matches played: 31
- Goals scored: 107 (3.45 per match)

The 1986–87 Irish League Cup (known as the Roadferry Freight League Cup for sponsorship reasons) was the inaugural edition of the Irish League Cup, Northern Ireland's secondary football knock-out cup competition. It concluded on 9 May 1987 with the final.

Linfield became the first ever winners of the competition after defeating Crusaders 2–1 in the final.

== First round ==
Team 1	Score	Team 2
Ards	1–0	Ballymoney United
Ballyclare Comrades	1–0	Larne
Ballymena United	8–1	Milford Everton
Banbridge Town	0–5	Linfield
Bangor	2–4	Limavady United
Carrick Rangers	1–0	Dungannon Swifts
Cliftonville	1–0	Harland & Wolff Welders
Cliftonville Olympic	2–1	Omagh Town
Coleraine	2–1	Chimney Corner
Crusaders	1–0	Queen's University
Distillery	1–0	UUJ
Glenavon	1–0	Brantwood
Glentoran	2–1	RUC
Glentoran II	4–1	U.U.C
Portadown	3–2	Dundela
Tobermore United	1–2	Newry Town

== Second round ==
Team 1	Score	Team 2
Ballyclare Comrades	0–3	Coleraine
Ballymena United	1–6	Linfield
Carrick Rangers	0–2	Glentoran
Cliftonville Olympic	0–2	Crusaders
Glenavon	2–1	Cliftonville
Glentoran II	4–2	Distillery
Newry Town	2–1	Ards
Portadown	0–3	Limavady United

== Quarter-finals ==
Team 1	Score	Team 2
Coleraine	1–2	Linfield
Crusaders	5–2	Limavady United
Glenavon	1–2	Newry Town
Glentoran	5–2	Glentoran II

== Semi-finals ==
Team 1	Score	Team 2
Crusaders	2–1	Glentoran
Linfield	2–1	Newry Town

== Final ==
9 May 1987

Linfield	2 – 1	Crusaders
Burrows 15'; McGaughey 53'	Report	Elliott 62'

The Oval, Belfast
Referee: Alan Snoddy (Carryduff)
