= 1994–95 Irish League Cup =

Wilkinson Sword League Cup

Tournament details
- Country: Northern Ireland
- Teams: 32

Final positions
- Champions: Ards (1st win)
- Runners-up: Cliftonville

Tournament statistics
- Matches played: 31
- Goals scored: 129 (4.16 per match)

The 1994–95 Irish League Cup (known as the Wilkinson Sword League Cup for sponsorship reasons) was the 9th edition of the Irish League Cup, Northern Ireland's secondary football knockout cup competition. It concluded on 25 April 1995 with the final.

Linfield unsuccessfully defended its 1994 title in the second round losing to Cliftonville. Cliftonville unsuccessfully defended its pursuit of a title on penalties in the final against first cup winners Ards.

== First round ==
Team 1	Score	Team 2
Ards	3–3 (6–5 p)	Dungannon Swifts
Ballyclare Comrades	3–2	Queen's University
Ballymena United	2–0	Ballinamallard United
Ballymoney United	2–5	Carrick Rangers
Banbridge Town	1–2	Crusaders
Bangor	2–1	Cookstown United
Brantwood	2–7	Omagh Town
Cliftonville	3–0	Moyola Park
Coleraine	3–1	Harland & Wolff Welders
Distillery	4–0	Tobermore United
Dundela	3–3 (2–4 p)	Newry Town
Glenavon	5–0	Limavady United
Glentoran	2–1	Loughgall
Larne	4–1	RUC
Linfield	5–0	Chimney Corner
Portadown	5–0	Armagh City

== Second round ==
Team 1	Score	Team 2
Ballymena United	1–2	Ballyclare Comrades
Bangor	3–2	Glentoran
Crusaders	5–0	Carrick Rangers
Larne	4–2	Distillery
Linfield	2–3	Cliftonville
Newry Town	0–2	Coleraine
Omagh Town	2–3	Ards
Portadown	3–1	Glenavon

== Quarter-finals ==
Team 1	Score	Team 2
Ballyclare Comrades	2–4	Ards
Bangor	2–0	Larne
Coleraine	0–2	Cliftonville
Crusaders	3–1	Portadown

== Semi-finals ==
Team 1	Score	Team 2
Ards	2–1	Bangor
Cliftonville	2–0	Crusaders

== Final ==
25 April 1995

Ards	0 – 0 (a.e.t.)	Cliftonville
	Report
Penalties
Erskine (penalty scored); McCann (penalty missed); Mooney (penalty scored); Murphy (penalty missed)	2 – 0	(penalty missed) O'Neill; (penalty missed) McDonald; (penalty missed) Gill; (penalty missed) Manley

Windsor Park, Belfast
Referee: Norman Cowie (Carryduff)
