= 2009–10 Irish League Cup =

Co-operative Insurance Cup

Tournament details
- Country: Northern Ireland
- Teams: 26

Final positions
- Champions: Glentoran (7th win)
- Runners-up: Coleraine

Tournament statistics
- Matches played: 47
- Goals scored: 145 (3.09 per match)

The 2009–10 Irish League Cup (known as the Co-operative Insurance Cup for sponsorship reasons) was the 24th edition of the Irish League Cup, Northern Ireland's secondary football knock-out cup competition. The tournament started on 28 August 2009 with the first round and ended on 27 March 2010 with the Final. The cup was contested by the 12 members of the IFA Premiership and the 14 members of IFA Championship 1.

Portadown were the defending champions after their second League Cup win last season; a 1–0 victory over Newry City in the previous final. This season however, they went out at the semi-final stage to eventual winners Glentoran, who defeated Coleraine 4–1 on penalties in the final after the game finished 2–2 following extra time. This was Glentoran's seventh League Cup win, and the eleventh time in thirteen years that the cup had been won by one of Belfast's Big Two.

== First round ==
The first legs were played on 28, 29 August and 1 October 2009. The second legs were played on 7 and 22 September 2009.

Team 1	Agg.	Team 2	1st leg	2nd leg
Ballyclare Comrades	3–5	Carrick Rangers	2–3	1–2
Ballymoney United	0–1	Larne	0–0	0–1
Bangor	2–3	Ballinamallard United	1–0	1–3
Coagh United	4–7	Ards	2–4	2–3
Donegal Celtic	4–2	Loughgall	2–1	2–1
Limavady United	5–1	Glebe Rangers	2–0	3–1

== Second round ==
The first legs were played on 26 September 2009. The second legs were played on 6 and 7 October 2009.

Team 1	Agg.	Team 2	1st leg	2nd leg
Carrick Rangers	1–7	Limavady United	0–1	1–6
Ards	2–2 (a)	Ballinamallard United	1–2	1–0
Banbridge Town	0–8	Larne	0–5	0–3
Armagh City	0–6	Donegal Celtic	0–3	0–3

== Third round ==
In this round entered winners from the previous round together with all 12 teams from IFA Premiership. The first legs were played on 31 October and 10 November 2009. The second legs were played 10 November and 1 December 2009.

Team 1	Agg.	Team 2	1st leg	2nd leg
Donegal Celtic	1–3	Cliftonville	0–1	1–2
Dungannon Swifts	8–4	Larne	3–1	5–3
Glentoran	5–4	Glenavon	2–2	3–2
Institute	4–2	Ballymena United	2–1	2–1
Newry City	1–1 (a)	Linfield	1–1	0–0
Portadown	6–4	Crusaders	2–1	4–3
Ballinamallard United	1–0	Limavady United	0–0	1–0
Lisburn Distillery	1–1 (4–5 p)	Coleraine	1–0	0–1 (aet)

== Quarter-finals ==
The first legs were played on 5 December 2009. The second legs were played on 15 December 2009.

Team 1	Agg.	Team 2	1st leg	2nd leg
Glentoran	2–2 (a)	Linfield	0–1	2–1
Ballinamallard United	3–6	Portadown	0–5	3–1
Cliftonville	3–4	Coleraine	2–3	1–1
Dungannon Swifts	7–2	Institute	6–2	1–0

== Semi-finals ==
2 February 2010

Glentoran	1 – 0	Portadown
Waterworth 20'	Report

Windsor Park, Belfast
Referee: Adrian McCourt

3 February 2010

Coleraine	2 – 0	Dungannon Swifts
Patterson 24'; Carson 60'	Report

The Oval, Belfast
Referee: David Malcolm

== Final ==
27 March 2010
14:30 UTC

Coleraine	2 – 2 (a.e.t.)	Glentoran
Boyce 7'; Patterson 32'	Report	Martyn 6'; Nixon 45'
Penalties
Canning (penalty missed); McVey (penalty scored); Boyce (penalty missed)	1–4	(penalty scored) Hamilton; (penalty scored) Neill; (penalty scored) Fordyce; (penalty scored) Burrows

Windsor Park, Belfast
Referee: Mark Courtney
