= 1987–88 Irish League Cup =

Roadferry Freight League Cup

Tournament details
- Country: Northern Ireland
- Teams: 32

Final positions
- Champions: Coleraine (1st win)
- Runners-up: Portadown

Tournament statistics
- Matches played: 31
- Goals scored: 98 (3.16 per match)

The 1987–88 Irish League Cup (known as the Roadferry Freight League Cup for sponsorship reasons) was the 2nd edition of the Irish League Cup, Northern Ireland's secondary football knockout cup competition. It concluded on 28 November 1987 with the final.

Linfield unsuccessfully defended its 1987 title in the semi-finals losing to eventual cup winners, Coleraine, who defeated in the final Portadown, 1–0.

== First round ==
Team 1	Score	Team 2
Ards	2–0	Tobermore United
Ballyclare Comrades	0–2	Glenavon
Ballymena United	3–1	Brantwood
Bangor	4–1	UUJ
Carrick Rangers	1–0	Banbridge Town
Cliftonville	0–1	Chimney Corner
Coleraine	6–0	Queen's University
Crusaders	2–0	Harland & Wolff Welders
Distillery	2–0	Omagh Town
Glentoran	3–0	RUC
Glentoran II	3–1 (aet)	Limavady United
Larne	2–1	Dungannon Swifts
Linfield	7–0	UUC
Linfield Swifts	1–0	Ballymoney United
Newry Town	2–1	Dundela
Portadown	2–0	Milford Everton

== Second round ==
Team 1	Score	Team 2
Bangor	2–3	Ballymena United
Carrick Rangers	0–4	Coleraine
Distillery	0–1 (aet)	Ards
Glentoran	5–0	Glenavon
Larne	2–0	Glentoran II
Linfield	2–1	Chimney Corner
Newry Town	1–1 (4–2 p)	Linfield Swifts
Portadown	5–0	Crusaders

== Quarter-finals ==
Team 1	Score	Team 2
Ards	1–1 (4–5 p)	Coleraine
Larne	3–2	Ballymena United
Linfield	2–1 (aet)	Newry Town
Portadown	4–1	Glentoran

== Semi-finals ==
Team 1	Score	Team 2
Linfield	0–0 (3–4 p)	Coleraine
Portadown	4–3	Larne

== Final ==
28 November 1987

Coleraine	1–0 (a.e.t.)	Portadown
McQuiston	Report

The Oval, Belfast
