= 2018–19 Northern Ireland Football League Cup =

BetMcLean League Cup

Tournament details
- Country: Northern Ireland
- Dates: 4 August 2018 – 16 February 2019
- Teams: 36

Final positions
- Champions: Linfield (10th title)
- Runners-up: Ballymena United

Tournament statistics
- Matches played: 35
- Goals scored: 136 (3.89 per match)

The 2018–19 Northern Ireland Football League Cup (known as the BetMcLean League Cup for sponsorship purposes) was the 33rd edition of Northern Ireland's football knockout cup competition for national league clubs, and the fifth edition of the competition as the Northern Ireland Football League Cup. This season's League Cup was contested by all 36 clubs of the three divisions of the Northern Ireland Football League. The competition began on 4 August 2018 with the first round, and concluded on 16 February 2019 with the final. The competition was sponsored by McLean Bookmakers.

Dungannon Swifts were the defending champions, after they defeated Ballymena United 3–1 in the 2018 final to win the competition for the first time and record the first ever senior trophy win since their formation in 1949. This season, Linfield were the eventual winners, defeating Ballymena United 1–0 in the final. Linfield were playing in the League Cup final for a record 13th time, and lifted the trophy for a record tenth time overall and the first time since they won the 2008 final 11 years earlier. Ballymena United appeared in the League Cup final for the third consecutive year - their fourth appearance in five years - and were consigned to defeat in the final for the second successive year and the third time in five years.

== Format and schedule ==
The competition was played in a straight knockout format and was open to the 36 members of the Northern Ireland Football League. Replays were not used in the competition, with all matches using extra time and penalties to determine the winner if necessary.

Round	First match date	Fixtures	Clubs
First round	4 August 2018	4	36 → 32
Second round	28 August 2018	16	32 → 16
Third round	9 October 2018	8	16 → 8
Quarter-finals	13 November 2018	4	8 → 4
Semi-finals	11 December 2018	2	4 → 2
Final	16 February 2019	1	2 → 1

== Results ==
The league tier of each club at the time of entering the competition is listed in parentheses.

=== First round ===
The matches took place on 4 August 2018.

Team 1	Score	Team 2
Dundela (2)	1–3	**Knockbreda (2)**
**Lurgan Celtic (3)**	4–0	Armagh City (3)
**PSNI (2)**	1–0	Banbridge Town (3)
Queens University (3)	3–4	**Lisburn Distillery (3)**

=== Second round ===
The matches took place on 28 August 2018 and 12 September 2018. The top 16 league clubs from the previous season were seeded in this round in order to avoid drawing each other.

Team 1	Score	Team 2
28 August 2018
Annagh United (3)	1–3	**Warrenpoint Town (1)**
**Ards (1)**	3–2	Newington YC (3)
**Ballinamallard United (2)**	4–1	Lurgan Celtic (3)
**Ballymena United (1)**	5–1	Dollingstown (3)
**Carrick Rangers (2)**	6–0	Sport & Leisure Swifts (3)
**Cliftonville (1)**	5–1	Lisburn Distillery (3)
**Coleraine (1)**	2–1	Ballyclare Comrades (2)
**Crusaders (1)**	4–1	PSNI (2)
**Dungannon Swifts (1)**	2–1 (aet)	Limavady United (2)
Glenavon (1)	0–1	**Dergview (2)**
**Glentoran (1)**	3–2 (aet)	Larne (2)
**Institute (1)**	5–1	Loughgall (2)
**Linfield (1)**	8–0	Moyola Park (3)
**Newry City (1)**	1–0	Knockbreda (2)
**Portadown (2)**	3–0 (aet)	Tobermore United (3)
12 September 2018
**Harland & Wolff Welders (2)**	3–3 (aet) (4–2p)	Portstewart (3)

Seeded	Unseeded
**Ards (1)**; **Ballinamallard United (2)**; **Ballymena United (1)**; **Carrick Rangers (2)**; **Cliftonville (1)**; **Coleraine (1)**; **Crusaders (1)**; **Dungannon Swifts (1)**; Glenavon (1); **Glentoran (1)**; **Harland & Wolff Welders (2)**; **Institute (1)**; **Linfield (1)**; **Newry City (1)**; **Portadown (2)**; **Warrenpoint Town (1)**	Annagh United (3); Ballyclare Comrades (2); **Dergview (2)**; Dollingstown (3); Knockbreda (2); Larne (2); Limavady United (2); Lisburn Distillery (3); Loughgall (2); Lurgan Celtic (3); Moyola Park (3); Newington YC (3); Portstewart (3); PSNI (2); Sport & Leisure Swifts (3); Tobermore United (3)
Clubs in **bold** = Second round winners

=== Third round ===
The matches took place on 9 October 2018 and 30 October 2018.

Team 1	Score	Team 2
9 October 2018
**Ballymena United (1)**	1–0	Harland & Wolff Welders (2)
**Cliftonville (1)**	3–2	Carrick Rangers (2)
**Crusaders (1)**	2–1	Ballinamallard United (2)
Dergview (2)	1–4	**Ards (1)**
Warrenpoint Town (1)	2–3 (aet)	**Dungannon Swifts (1)**
30 October 2018
**Glentoran (1)**	3–3 (aet) (3–2p)	Coleraine (1)
**Linfield (1)**	5–0	Institute (1)
Newry City (1)	1–1 (aet) (1–4p)	**Portadown (2)**

=== Quarter-finals ===
The matches took place on 13 November 2018, 20 November 2018, and 4 December 2018.

Team 1	Score	Team 2
13 November 2018
Ards (1)	0–1	**Ballymena United (1)**
Glentoran (1)	2–4	**Crusaders (1)**
20 November 2018
Cliftonville (1)	1–1 (aet) (2–3p)	**Dungannon Swifts (1)**
4 December 2018
Portadown (2)	1–2	**Linfield (1)**

=== Semi-finals ===
Both matches took place on 11 December 2018.

Team 1	Score	Team 2
Crusaders (1)	0–1	**Ballymena United (1)**
Dungannon Swifts (1)	0–1 (aet)	**Linfield (1)**

=== Final ===
The final was played on 16 February 2019 at Windsor Park.

16 February 2019
17:30 GMT

Ballymena United (1)	0 – 1	Linfield (1)
	NIFL	Waterworth 15'

Windsor Park, Belfast
Referee: Andrew Davey
