= 2005–06 Irish League Cup =

CIS Insurance Cup

Tournament details
- Country: Northern Ireland
- Teams: 16

Final positions
- Champions: Linfield (8th win)
- Runners-up: Glentoran

Tournament statistics
- Matches played: 55
- Goals scored: 180 (3.27 per match)

The 2005–06 Irish League Cup (known as the CIS Insurance Cup for sponsorship reasons) was the 20th edition of the Irish League Cup, Northern Ireland's secondary football knock-out cup competition. It concluded on 10 December 2005 with the final.

Glentoran were the defending champions after their fifth League Cup win last season; a 2–1 victory over Linfield in the previous final. This season both clubs reached the final again but this time Linfield came out on top by defeating the Glens 3–0 to lift the cup for the eighth time, with Glenn Ferguson scoring a Hat-trick. This was the seventh, and to date, last time that both clubs met in the final.

The 16 clubs taking part were divided into four groups of four clubs. The clubs in each group played each other at home and away. The top two clubs from each group then advanced to the quarter-finals where they played a single knock-out tie against another quarter-finalist. The semi-finals were played in the same format with the two winners of the ties advancing to the single match final.

== Group stage ==
=== Group A ===
Team	Pld	W	D	L	GF	GA	GD	Pts	GLT	ARM	INS	COL
Glentoran (A)	6	5	1	0	14	7	+7	16		2–2	3–2	1–0
Armagh City (A)	6	3	2	1	12	9	+3	11	1–2		5–3	1–0
Institute	6	1	1	4	9	13	−4	4	1–2	1–2		1–0
Coleraine	6	0	2	4	3	9	−6	2	1–4	1–1	1–1	

Source: rsssf.com
(A) Advanced to quarter-finals

=== Group B ===
Team	Pld	W	D	L	GF	GA	GD	Pts	POR	NEW	BYM	GLA
Portadown (A)	6	4	2	0	10	5	+5	14		2–1	1–0	3–1
Newry City (A)	6	3	2	1	9	7	+2	11	1–1		1–1	1–0
Ballymena United	6	2	2	2	6	6	0	8	1–1	1–2		1–0
Glenavon	6	0	0	6	5	12	−7	0	1–2	2–3	1–2	

Source: rsssf.com
(A) Advanced to quarter-finals

=== Group C ===
Team	Pld	W	D	L	GF	GA	GD	Pts	LIN	LIM	ARD	LGL
Linfield (A)	6	6	0	0	20	1	+19	18		2–0	1–0	2–0
Limavady United (A)	6	3	1	2	9	12	−3	10	1–6		1–1	2–1
Ards	6	2	1	3	6	12	−6	7	0–7	0–1		2–1
Loughgall	6	0	0	6	5	15	−10	0	0–2	2–4	1–3	

Source: rsssf.com
(A) Advanced to quarter-finals

=== Group D ===
Team	Pld	W	D	L	GF	GA	GD	Pts	LIS	DUN	CLI	LRN
Lisburn Distillery (A)	6	3	2	1	11	5	+6	11		3–1	0–0	0–2
Dungannon Swifts (A)	6	3	1	2	18	13	+5	10	0–2		2–2	4–1
Cliftonville	6	1	4	1	6	7	−1	7	1–1	2–4		0–0
Larne	6	1	1	4	7	17	−10	4	1–5	3–7	0–1	

Source: rsssf.com
(A) Advanced to quarter-finals

== Quarter-finals ==
Team 1	Score	Team 2
Glentoran	2–1	Newry City
Linfield	4–0	Dungannon Swifts
Lisburn Distillery	6–0	Limavady United
Portadown	4–2	Armagh City

== Semi-finals ==
Team 1	Score	Team 2
Glentoran	2–1	Portadown
Linfield	5–0	Lisburn Distillery

== Final ==
10 December 2005

Linfield	3 – 0	Glentoran
Ferguson 3', 49', 75'	Report

Windsor Park, Belfast
