= 2004–05 Irish League Cup =

CIS Insurance Cup

Tournament details
- Country: Northern Ireland
- Teams: 16

Final positions
- Champions: Glentoran (5th win)
- Runners-up: Linfield

Tournament statistics
- Matches played: 55
- Goals scored: 162 (2.95 per match)

The 2004–05 Irish League Cup (known as the CIS Insurance Cup for sponsorship reasons) was the 19th edition of the Irish League Cup, Northern Ireland's secondary football knock-out cup competition. It concluded on 9 November 2004 with the final.

Cliftonville were the defending champions after their first ever League Cup win the previous season; a penalty shootout victory over Larne in the previous final. This season Cliftonville reached the semi-finals but were defeated by Linfield, who were then defeated 2–1 in the final by cup winners Glentoran. This was the eighth final in nine years that had featured either Linfield or Glentoran, and the third time in four years that both clubs had faced each other in the final. It was also Glentoran's second cup win in three years, taking their tally to five League Cups overall.

The 16 clubs taking part were divided into four groups of four clubs. The clubs in each group played each other at home and away. The top two clubs from each group then advanced to the quarter-finals where they played a single knock-out tie against another quarter-finalist. The semi-finals were played in the same format with the two winners of the ties advancing to the single match final.

== Group stage ==
=== Group A ===
| Pos | Team | Pld | W | D | L | GF | GA | GD | Pts | LIN | ARD | CRU | LGL |
|---|---|---|---|---|---|---|---|---|---|---|---|---|---|
| 1 | Linfield (A) | 6 | 5 | 1 | 0 | 15 | 3 | +12 | 16 | | 0–0 | 4–0 | 5–1 |
| 2 | Ards (A) | 6 | 2 | 1 | 3 | 6 | 7 | −1 | 7 | 1–2 | | 3–2 | 0–0 |
| 3 | Crusaders | 6 | 2 | 1 | 3 | 7 | 10 | −3 | 7 | 0–2 | 2–0 | | 3–0 |
| 4 | Loughgall | 6 | 1 | 1 | 4 | 4 | 12 | −8 | 4 | 1–2 | 1–0 | 1–1 | |

Source: Irish Football Club Project
(A) Advanced to quarter-finals

=== Group B ===
| Pos | Team | Pld | W | D | L | GF | GA | GD | Pts | CLI | DUN | POR | LIM |
|---|---|---|---|---|---|---|---|---|---|---|---|---|---|
| 1 | Cliftonville (A) | 6 | 3 | 2 | 1 | 8 | 5 | +3 | 11 | | 2–0 | 1–3 | 1–1 |
| 2 | Dungannon Swifts (A) | 6 | 3 | 2 | 1 | 8 | 6 | +2 | 11 | 0–0 | | 2–1 | 3–1 |
| 3 | Portadown | 6 | 3 | 1 | 2 | 11 | 7 | +4 | 10 | 0–1 | 1–1 | | 3–1 |
| 4 | Limavady United | 6 | 0 | 1 | 5 | 6 | 15 | −9 | 1 | 1–3 | 1–2 | 1–3 | |

Source: Irish Football Club Project
(A) Advanced to quarter-finals

=== Group C ===
| Pos | Team | Pld | W | D | L | GF | GA | GD | Pts | LIS | BYM | INS | LRN |
|---|---|---|---|---|---|---|---|---|---|---|---|---|---|
| 1 | Lisburn Distillery (A) | 6 | 3 | 2 | 1 | 13 | 4 | +9 | 11 | | 2–2 | 3–0 | 0–1 |
| 2 | Ballymena United (A) | 6 | 2 | 3 | 1 | 9 | 7 | +2 | 9 | 1–1 | | 3–0 | 1–3 |
| 3 | Institute | 6 | 2 | 1 | 3 | 8 | 10 | −2 | 7 | 0–2 | 1–1 | | 4–1 |
| 4 | Larne | 6 | 2 | 0 | 4 | 5 | 14 | −9 | 6 | 0–5 | 0–1 | 0–3 | |

Source: Irish Football Club Project
(A) Advanced to quarter-finals

=== Group D ===
| Pos | Team | Pld | W | D | L | GF | GA | GD | Pts | GLT | COL | NEW | OMA |
|---|---|---|---|---|---|---|---|---|---|---|---|---|---|
| 1 | Glentoran (A) | 6 | 5 | 1 | 0 | 20 | 5 | +15 | 16 | | 1–1 | 3–2 | 4–0 |
| 2 | Coleraine (A) | 6 | 3 | 1 | 2 | 8 | 7 | +1 | 10 | 0–3 | | 1–0 | 2–0 |
| 3 | Newry City | 6 | 3 | 0 | 3 | 12 | 12 | 0 | 9 | 0–4 | 3–1 | | 4–2 |
| 4 | Omagh Town | 6 | 0 | 0 | 6 | 5 | 21 | −16 | 0 | 2–5 | 0–3 | 1–3 | |

Source: Irish Football Club Project
(A) Advanced to quarter-finals

== Quarter-finals ==
| Team 1 | Score | Team 2 |
|---|---|---|
| Cliftonville | 2–1 | Ards |
| Glentoran | 1–0 | Ballymena United |
| Linfield | 3–1 | Dungannon Swifts |
| Lisburn Distillery | 1–0 | Coleraine |

== Semi-finals ==
| Team 1 | Score | Team 2 |
|---|---|---|
| Cliftonville | 1–2 (aet) | Linfield (at The Oval) |
| Glentoran | 2–0 | Lisburn Distillery |

== Final ==
9 November 2004

| Linfield | 1 – 2 (a.e.t.) | Glentoran |
|---|---|---|
| Picking 81' | Report | Lockhart 4'; Morgan 104' |

Windsor Park, Belfast
