= 2007–08 Irish League Cup =

CIS Insurance Cup

Tournament details
- Country: Northern Ireland
- Teams: 16

Final positions
- Champions: Linfield (9th win)
- Runners-up: Crusaders

Tournament statistics
- Matches played: 55
- Goals scored: 182 (3.31 per match)

The 2007–08 Irish League Cup (known as the CIS Insurance Cup for sponsorship reasons) was the 22nd edition of the Irish League Cup, Northern Ireland's secondary football knock-out cup competition. It concluded on 2 February 2008 with the final.

Glentoran were the defending champions after their sixth League Cup win last season; a 1–0 victory over Cliftonville in the previous final. This season Glentoran went out at the semi-final stage to Crusaders, who were then defeated 3–2 by Linfield in the final. This was a record ninth League Cup win for Linfield, and would be their last one for 11 years until they won the 2019 final. This was also the tenth time in eleven years that the cup had been won by one of Belfast's Big Two.

The 16 clubs taking part were divided into four groups of four clubs. The clubs in each group played each other at home and away. The top two clubs from each group then advanced to the quarter-finals where they played a single knock-out tie against another quarter-finalist. The semi-finals were played in the same format with the two winners of the ties advancing to the single match final.

== Group stage ==
=== Group A ===
Team	Pld	W	D	L	GF	GA	GD	Pts	LIN	DUN	GLA	BYM
Linfield (A)	6	5	1	0	13	2	+11	16		1–1	2–0	5–1
Dungannon Swifts (A)	6	3	1	2	7	6	+1	10	0–1		2–1	1–0
Glenavon	6	1	1	4	8	13	−5	4	0–1	3–2		1–3
Ballymena United	6	1	1	4	7	14	−7	4	0–3	0–1	3–3	

Source: rsssf.com
(A) Advanced to quarter-finals

=== Group B ===
Team	Pld	W	D	L	GF	GA	GD	Pts	GLT	LIS	LRN	ARM
Glentoran (A)	6	6	0	0	19	6	+13	18		3–1	3–2	6–0
Lisburn Distillery (A)	6	3	1	2	9	8	+1	10	1–2		2–1	1–0
Larne	6	1	1	4	11	13	−2	4	2–3	1–1		3–1
Armagh City	6	1	0	5	5	17	−12	3	0–2	1–3	3–2	

Source: rsssf.com
(A) Advanced to quarter-finals

=== Group C ===
Team	Pld	W	D	L	GF	GA	GD	Pts	CLI	CRU	DGC	LIM
Cliftonville (A)	6	4	2	0	12	5	+7	14		1–0	2–2	2–0
Crusaders (A)	6	3	1	2	11	12	−1	10	1–4		0–0	1–0
Donegal Celtic	6	1	2	3	9	11	−2	5	0–1	3–4		3–2
Limavady United	6	1	1	4	10	14	−4	4	2–2	4–5	2–1	

Source: rsssf.com
(A) Advanced to quarter-finals

=== Group D ===
Team	Pld	W	D	L	GF	GA	GD	Pts	POR	NEW	COL	INS
Portadown (A)	6	5	1	0	12	6	+6	16		0–0	2–1	2–1
Newry City (A)	6	4	1	1	8	5	+3	13	1–3		1–0	1–0
Coleraine	6	0	2	4	7	11	−4	2	2–3	1–2		1–1
Institute	6	0	2	4	6	11	−5	2	1–2	1–3	2–2	

Source: rsssf.com
(A) Advanced to quarter-finals

== Quarter-finals ==
Team 1	Score	Team 2
Cliftonville	3–3 (5–6 p)	Newry City
Glentoran	1–0	Dungannon Swifts
Linfield	5–1	Lisburn Distillery
Portadown	3–4	Crusaders

== Semi-finals ==
Team 1	Score	Team 2
Crusaders	1–0	Glentoran
Linfield	1–1 (4–3 p)	Newry City

== Final ==
2 February 2008

Crusaders	2 – 3	Linfield
Rainey 54'; Brown 77'	Report	Thompson 46'; Ferguson 86', 89'

Windsor Park, Belfast
