= 2002–03 Irish League Cup =

CIS Insurance Cup

Tournament details
- Country: Northern Ireland
- Teams: 20

Final positions
- Champions: Glentoran (4th win)
- Runners-up: Linfield

Tournament statistics
- Matches played: 47
- Goals scored: 146 (3.11 per match)

The 2002–03 Irish League Cup (known as the CIS Insurance Cup for sponsorship reasons) was the 17th edition of the Irish League Cup, Northern Ireland's secondary football knock-out cup competition. It concluded on 3 December 2002 with the final.

Linfield were the defending champions after their seventh League Cup win last season; a 3–1 victory over Glentoran in the previous final. This season both clubs met in the final again but this time Glentoran defeated Linfield 2–0 in the final to win their fourth League Cup overall, and second in three years. This was the fourth time in six years that the two clubs had met in the final, with Linfield coming out on top on all three of the previous occasions.

The twenty clubs taking part were divided into four groups of five clubs based on region. The clubs in each group played each other once, either at home or away. The top two clubs from each group then advanced to the quarter-finals where they played a single knock-out tie against another quarter-finalist. The semi-finals were played in the same format with the two winners of the ties advancing to the single match final.

== Group stage ==
=== Eastern Region ===
Team	Pld	W	D	L	GF	GA	GD	Pts	CLI	CRU	CRK	LRN	BCC
Cliftonville (A)	4	2	2	0	6	3	+3	8		1–1		2–1	
Crusaders (A)	4	2	2	0	4	2	+2	8			1–1		1–0
Carrick Rangers	4	1	3	0	4	2	+2	6	1–1			2–0	
Larne	4	1	0	3	5	7	−2	3		0–1			4–2
Ballyclare Comrades	4	0	1	3	2	7	−5	1	0–2		0–0		

Source: rsssf.com
(A) Advanced to quarter-finals

=== Greater Belfast Region ===
Team	Pld	W	D	L	GF	GA	GD	Pts	LIN	GLT	LIS	ARD	BGR
Linfield (A)	4	3	1	0	10	5	+5	10				4–3	3–0
Glentoran (A)	4	2	2	0	6	3	+3	8	1–1		2–1		
Lisburn Distillery	4	1	1	2	5	5	0	4	1–2			1–1	
Ards	4	0	2	2	5	8	−3	2		1–3			0–0
Bangor	4	0	2	2	0	5	−5	2		0–0	0–2		

Source: rsssf.com
(A) Advanced to quarter-finals

=== Northern Region ===
Team	Pld	W	D	L	GF	GA	GD	Pts	BYM	OMA	COL	INS	LIM
Ballymena United (A)	4	3	1	0	15	3	+12	10			3–1	5–1	
Omagh Town (A)	4	3	1	0	6	2	+4	10	0–0				2–1
Coleraine	4	2	0	2	11	10	+1	6		1–3		4–3	
Institute	4	1	0	3	5	10	−5	3		0–1			1–0
Limavady United	4	0	0	4	3	15	−12	0	1–7		1–5		

Source: rsssf.com
(A) Advanced to quarter-finals

=== Southern Region ===
Team	Pld	W	D	L	GF	GA	GD	Pts	POR	GLA	DUN	NEW	ARM
Portadown (A)	4	3	0	1	13	4	+9	9				1–2	7–0
Glenavon (A)	4	2	0	2	5	4	+1	6	0–2			3–0	
Dungannon Swifts	4	2	0	2	7	7	0	6	2–3	2–1			
Newry Town	4	2	0	2	4	6	−2	6			2–0		0–2
Armagh City	4	1	0	3	3	11	−8	3		0–1	1–3		

Source: rsssf.com
(A) Advanced to quarter-finals

== Quarter-finals ==
Team 1	Score	Team 2
Ballymena United	2–0	Crusaders
Cliftonville	0–5	Omagh Town
Linfield	2–0	Glenavon
Portadown	1–2	Glentoran

== Semi-finals ==
Team 1	Score	Team 2
Glentoran	5–3	Ballymena United
Omagh Town	2–3	Linfield

== Final ==
3 December 2002

Glentoran	2 – 0	Linfield
Halliday 27'; Smyth 63'	Report

Windsor Park, Belfast
