= Northern Ireland Football League Cup =

Association football tournament in Northern Ireland

- Organiser(s): Northern Ireland Football League
- Founded: 1987
- Region: Northern Ireland
- Teams: 38
- Current champions: Linfield (13th title) (2025–26)
- Most championships: Linfield (13 titles)
- 2025–26 season

The Northern Ireland Football League Cup (known as the BetMcLean Cup for sponsorship purposes, and commonly known as the Irish League Cup) is a national football knock-out cup competition in Northern Ireland open to all member clubs of the Northern Ireland Football League. It is the third-most prestigious competition in domestic Northern Irish football after the NIFL Premiership and Irish Cup. Unlike the Irish Cup, the League Cup does not have a berth for UEFA Conference League qualification. The cup has been operated by the Northern Ireland Football League since the 2013–14 season when it took over the administration from the Irish Football Association (IFA), after which the cup was renamed to the Northern Ireland Football League (NIFL) Cup.

Since the 2017–18 season, the Cup has been sponsored by McLean Bookmakers. The competition's previous sponsors are JBE (2015–16), WASP Solutions (2013–14 and 2014–15), Irn Bru (2011–12 and 2012–13), Co-operative Insurance (2001–02 to 2010–11), Coca-Cola (1998–99 to 2000–01), Wilkinson Sword (1991–92 to 1997–98) and Roadferry Freight (1986–87 to 1990–91).

Linfield are the current holders. They defeated Glentoran 1–0 after extra time in the final on 15 March 2026 to lift the cup for the thirteenth time.

== Format ==
Unlike the Irish Cup, the League Cup is restricted to the 38 Northern Ireland Football League clubs competing in the NIFL Premiership, NIFL Championship, and NIFL Premier Intermediate League. All rounds of the competition use a knock-out system consisting of one-legged ties. In the event that the scores are level after 90 minutes, extra time is played, and if the teams are still level after 120 minutes there is a penalty shoot-out.

The 14 NIFL Premier Intermediate League clubs enter the preliminary round draw, with 12 of them being drawn to face each other in six ties and the remaining two clubs receiving byes. The six preliminary round winners and the two clubs that received byes then join the 24 NIFL Premiership and Championship clubs in the first round. The 16 highest-ranked clubs from the previous season's league system are then seeded in the first round to avoid drawing each other. The first round is the only round of the competition in which seeding is used. From there on the competition uses an open draw with a standard knock-out format, consisting of the second round, quarter-finals, semi-finals and the final.

== History ==
The competition began with 32 clubs in a straight knock-out format in February 1987, and included teams from the Irish League B Division until 1997–98. From 1998–99 until 2007–08, only senior (Irish League and Irish Premier League) teams competed, but the competition was opened up to the 17 Championship clubs in 2008–09, and again in 2010–11 to include clubs from Championship 2, after the Championship 2 League Cup was abolished. From 2001–02 until 2007–08, a group stage followed by a knock-out system was used instead of the straight knock-out system, and for two seasons (2008–09 and 2009–10) two-legged home and away aggregate ties were used up until the quarter-finals, instead of single matches.

When it was first introduced in the 1986–87 season, it was one of a number of senior cup competitions run by the Irish League, originally to compensate for the relatively few league fixtures (traditionally 22 or 26), but also as vehicles for sponsorship revenue. The League Cup would have been considered less prestigious than the long-standing Gold Cup and Ulster Cup. Over time however, these other cup competitions were phased out as the number of Irish League fixtures increased and the public appetite for additional competitions reduced, leaving the League Cup as the only cup competition run by the Northern Ireland Football League and now established as the third most prestigious competition in Northern Ireland after the national top-flight and national cup. The actual trophy presented to the winners is the old City Cup, which was another senior Irish League competition that was discontinued in 1975.

The first final took place on 9 May 1987 at Glentoran's ground, the Oval, and was contested by Linfield and Crusaders. Linfield became the inaugural winners of the cup, defeating Crusaders 2–1. Since then, Linfield have been the most successful club in the competition, winning the Cup a record 12 times overall in a record 15 final appearances - their three final defeats all coming against Big Two rivals Glentoran. The most common final has indeed been the Big Two derby, which has occurred seven times - the last of which came in 2005–06. The 1988–89 final, played between the two sides at the Oval on 11 November 1988 was won courtesy of a goal by Glentoran goalkeeper Alan Patterson, via a kick from his own penalty area. This was the first time that a goalkeeper had ever scored in a British football final.

Cliftonville hold the record for the most consecutive wins with four between 2013 and 2016. Fifteen different clubs have reached the final, but only twelve clubs have gone on to win the cup - and only six of those have won the cup more than once. Carrick Rangers (once), along with Larne and Newry City (twice each) are the only three clubs to have played in the final but never won the Cup. Conversely, three clubs have a 100% record in the final, lifting the cup in their sole final appearance to date: Bangor in 1992–93, Lisburn Distillery in 2010–11, and Dungannon Swifts in 2017–18. In 2008–09, Championship side Portadown became the first intermediate club and the first club from outside the top flight to reach the final, and subsequently to win the cup, after defeating Premiership side Newry City 1–0. That was also the first final to be played outside Belfast, with Mourneview Park, Lurgan hosting the match. It was attended by UEFA President Michel Platini and Northern Ireland manager Nigel Worthington who was in Northern Ireland for the FIFA meeting held in Newcastle.

The biggest winning margin ever recorded in a final is 4–0, which has occurred twice: in 1999–2000 when Linfield defeated Coleraine, and in 2012–13 when Cliftonville defeated Crusaders. On four occasions, the same two clubs have met in consecutive finals. Linfield and Glentoran have done so three times: 1997–98 & 1998–99, 2001–02 & 2002–03 and 2004–05 & 2005–06, while Cliftonville and Crusaders repeated the feat in 2012–13 and 2013–14. Both clubs agreed to toss a coin for home advantage in the 2013–14 final, with Cliftonville winning the toss. As a result, Solitude was chosen as the final venue for the first time in the competition's history.

In the 2015–16 competition, Cliftonville became the first club ever to reach four consecutive League Cup finals, and subsequently to win four consecutive Cups, after they defeated Ards 3–0 in the final. Ards were appearing in the final for the third time overall, and became only the second club from outside the top flight ever to reach the League Cup final, emulating Portadown in 2008–09. Ards' previous final appearance had also been against Cliftonville, when they won the Cup 2–0 on penalties after a 0–0 draw in 1994–95. Ards also set a record for the longest gap between final appearances of 21 years between 1994–95 and 2015–16. This broke the previous record of 19 years between Newry City's appearances in 1989–90 and 2008–09.

Following a one-year hiatus in which the cup was not played during the 2020–21 season as a result of the COVID-19 pandemic in Northern Ireland, the competition returned for the 2021–22 season, which saw the final being played on a Sunday for the first time in the competition's history. This attracted a League Cup final record crowd of 11,103 at Windsor Park, where Cliftonville won the cup for the sixth time after a 4–3 win over defending champions Coleraine in extra time. This also became the highest-scoring final in the cup's history.

== Media coverage ==
The final was initially broadcast as highlights on UTV throughout the 1990s and early 2000s. Live coverage of the final first began on the BBC in 2005, and continued until Sky acquired the rights to show the 2013 and 2014 finals on Sky Sports as part of a deal to cover Northern Ireland international matches. Following the 2014 final, it returned to the BBC in 2015 after Sky ceased their coverage of Irish League football. Dungannon Swifts' win in the 2018 final was broadcast live on Sky Sports enabling the entire town of Dungannon to enjoy the historical result, Dungannon winning a major trophy for the first time in their history .

== Records ==
- Most final wins: 13, Linfield
- Most consecutive final wins: 4, Cliftonville (2012–13, 2013–14, 2014–15 & 2015–16)
- Most final appearances: 16, Linfield
- Most consecutive final appearances: 4, Cliftonville (2012–13, 2013–14, 2014–15 & 2015–16)
- Most final defeats: 7, Coleraine (1992–93, 1993–94, 1999–00, 2009–10, 2011–12, 2021–22 & 2022–23)
- Most consecutive final defeats: 3, Glentoran (1996–97, 1997–98 & 1998–99)
- Highest-scoring final: 7 goals, Cliftonville 4–3 (a.e.t.) Coleraine (2021–22)
- Biggest final winning margin: 4 goals, joint record:
  - Linfield 4–0 Coleraine (1999–2000)
  - Cliftonville 4–0 Crusaders (2012–13)
- Longest gap between final wins: 32 years, 2 months and 18 days, Coleraine (1987–88 & 2019–20)
- Longest gap between final appearances: 20 years, 9 months and 19 days, Ards (1994–95 & 2015–16)
- Most final appearances without winning: 2, joint record:
  - Larne (1991–92 & 2003–04)
  - Newry City (1989–90 & 2008–09)
- Most common final: Glentoran v Linfield, 8 times (1988–89, 1997–98, 1998–99, 2001–02, 2002–03, 2004–05, 2005–06 & 2025–26)
- Record win: Ards 12–0 UUJ (first round, 1989–90)

== Final results ==
(a.e.t.)	Match level after 90 minutes. Decided in extra time.
(a.e.t.) pens.	Match level after 90 minutes and extra time. Decided by a penalty shootout.

Edition	Season	Date	Winner (number of wins)	Score	Runner-up	Venue	Attendance	Title Sponsor
1	1986–87	9 May 1987	Linfield (1)	2 – 1	Crusaders	The Oval, Belfast		Roadferry Freight
2	1987–88	28 November 1987	Coleraine (1)	1 – 0 (a.e.t.)	Portadown	The Oval, Belfast		Roadferry Freight
3	1988–89	30 November 1988	Glentoran (1)	2 – 1	Linfield	The Oval, Belfast	10,000	Roadferry Freight
4	1989–90	19 December 1989	Glenavon (1)	3 – 1	Newry Town	Windsor Park, Belfast	1,000	Roadferry Freight
5	1990–91	13 March 1991	Glentoran (2)	2 – 0	Ards	Windsor Park, Belfast	4,000	Roadferry Freight
6	1991–92	14 April 1992	Linfield (2)	3 – 0	Larne	The Oval, Belfast		Wilkinson Sword
7	1992–93	20 April 1993	Bangor (1)	3 – 0	Coleraine	Windsor Park, Belfast	2,000	Wilkinson Sword
8	1993–94	26 April 1994	Linfield (3)	2 – 0	Coleraine	The Oval, Belfast	4,500	Wilkinson Sword
9	1994–95	25 April 1995	Ards (1)	0 – 0 (a.e.t.) (2 – 0 pens.)	Cliftonville	Windsor Park, Belfast	3,500	Wilkinson Sword
10	1995–96	19 September 1995	Portadown (1)	2 – 1	Crusaders	Windsor Park, Belfast	2,600	Wilkinson Sword
11	1996–97	15 October 1996	Crusaders (1)	1 – 0	Glentoran	Windsor Park, Belfast	3,000	Wilkinson Sword
12	1997–98	9 September 1997	Linfield (4)	1 – 0	Glentoran	Windsor Park, Belfast		Wilkinson Sword
13	1998–99	4 May 1999	Linfield (5)	2 – 1 (a.e.t.)	Glentoran	Windsor Park, Belfast	6,500	Coca-Cola
14	1999–2000	18 April 2000	Linfield (6)	4 – 0	Coleraine	Windsor Park, Belfast	2,963	Coca-Cola
15	2000–01	24 April 2001	Glentoran (3)	1 – 0	Glenavon	Windsor Park, Belfast	2,515	Coca-Cola
16	2001–02	27 November 2001	Linfield (7)	3 – 1	Glentoran	Windsor Park, Belfast	6,200	Co-operative Insurance
17	2002–03	3 December 2002	Glentoran (4)	2 – 0	Linfield	Windsor Park, Belfast	5,700	Co-operative Insurance
18	2003–04	11 November 2003	Cliftonville (1)	1 – 1 (a.e.t.) (5 – 4 pens.)	Larne	Windsor Park, Belfast	2,500	Co-operative Insurance
19	2004–05	9 November 2004	Glentoran (5)	2 – 1 (a.e.t.)	Linfield	Windsor Park, Belfast	6,000	Co-operative Insurance
20	2005–06	10 December 2005	Linfield (8)	3 – 0	Glentoran	Windsor Park, Belfast	6,845	Co-operative Insurance
21	2006–07	2 December 2006	Glentoran (6)	1 – 0	Cliftonville	Windsor Park, Belfast	6,910	Co-operative Insurance
22	2007–08	2 February 2008	Linfield (9)	3 – 2	Crusaders	Windsor Park, Belfast	5,200	Co-operative Insurance
23	2008–09	28 February 2009	Portadown (2)	1 – 0	Newry City	Mourneview Park, Lurgan	4,100	Co-operative Insurance
24	2009–10	27 March 2010	Glentoran (7)	2 – 2 (a.e.t.) (4 – 1 pens.)	Coleraine	Windsor Park, Belfast		Co-operative Insurance
25	2010–11	2 April 2011	Lisburn Distillery (1)	2 – 1	Portadown	Mourneview Park, Lurgan		Co-operative Insurance
26	2011–12	28 January 2012	Crusaders (2)	1 – 0	Coleraine	Ballymena Showgrounds, Ballymena		Irn-Bru
27	2012–13	26 January 2013	Cliftonville (2)	4 – 0	Crusaders	Windsor Park, Belfast	4,948	Irn-Bru
28	2013–14	25 January 2014	Cliftonville (3)	0 – 0 (a.e.t.) (3 – 2 pens.)	Crusaders	Solitude, Belfast	4,300	WASP Solutions
29	2014–15	24 January 2015	Cliftonville (4)	3 – 2	Ballymena United	Windsor Park, Belfast	2,654	WASP Solutions
30	2015–16	13 February 2016	Cliftonville (5)	3 – 0	Ards	Solitude, Belfast	2,930	JBE Mechanical Electrical
31	2016–17	18 February 2017	Ballymena United (1)	2 – 0	Carrick Rangers	Seaview, Belfast	3,031	No sponsor
32	2017–18	17 February 2018	Dungannon Swifts (1)	3 – 1	Ballymena United	Windsor Park, Belfast	2,995	BetMcLean.com
33	2018–19	16 February 2019	Linfield (10)	1 – 0	Ballymena United	Windsor Park, Belfast	5,700	BetMcLean.com
34	2019–20	15 February 2020	Coleraine (2)	2 – 1	Crusaders	Windsor Park, Belfast	4,688	BetMcLean.com
	2020–21		Competition not held due to the COVID-19 pandemic in Northern Ireland					BetMcLean.com
35	2021–22	13 March 2022	Cliftonville (6)	4 – 3 (a.e.t.)	Coleraine	Windsor Park, Belfast	11,103	BetMcLean.com
36	2022–23	12 March 2023	Linfield (11)	2 – 0	Coleraine	Windsor Park, Belfast	11,038	BetMcLean.com
37	2023–24	10 March 2024	Linfield (12)	3 – 1	Portadown	Windsor Park, Belfast	9,179	BetMcLean.com
38	2024–25	9 March 2025	Cliftonville (7)	1 – 0 (a.e.t.)	Glentoran	Windsor Park, Belfast	14,539	BetMcLean.com
39	2025–26	15 March 2026	Linfield (13)	1 – 0 (a.e.t.)	Glentoran	Windsor Park, Belfast	12,297	BetMcLean.com

=== Performance by club ===
Club	Winners	Runners-up	Winning years	Runners-up years
Linfield	13	3	1986–87, 1991–92, 1993–94, 1997–98, 1998–99, 1999–00, 2001–02, 2005–06, 2007–08, 2018–19, 2022–23, 2023–24, 2025–26	1988–89, 2002–03, 2004–05
Glentoran	7	7	1988–89, 1990–91, 2000–01, 2002–03, 2004–05, 2006–07, 2009–10	1996–97, 1997–98, 1998–99, 2001–02, 2005–06, 2024–25, 2025–26
Cliftonville	7	2	2003–04, 2012–13, 2013–14, 2014–15, 2015–16, 2021–22, 2024–25	1994–95, 2006–07
Coleraine	2	7	1987–88, 2019–20	1992–93, 1993–94, 1999–00, 2009–10, 2011–12, 2021–22, 2022–23
Crusaders	2	6	1996–97, 2011–12	1986–87, 1995–96, 2007–08, 2012–13, 2013–14, 2019–20
Portadown	2	3	1995–96, 2008–09	1987–88, 2010–11, 2023–24
Ballymena United	1	3	2016–17	2014–15, 2017–18, 2018–19
Ards	1	2	1994–95	1990–91, 2015–16
Glenavon	1	1	1989–90	2000–01
Bangor	1	0	1992–93	–
Lisburn Distillery	1	0	2010–11	–
Dungannon Swifts	1	0	2017–18	–
Larne	0	2	–	1991–92, 2003–04
Newry City	0	2	–	1989–90, 2008–09
Carrick Rangers	0	1	–	2016–17

== Final venues ==
There have been 39 League Cup finals contested during the competition's history so far, played at six different grounds. Windsor Park has been the most common venue, having hosted 28 finals.

Venue	Finals hosted	First final	Last final
Windsor Park	28	1989–90	2025–26
The Oval	5	1986–87	1993–94
Mourneview Park	2	2008–09	2010–11
Solitude	2	2013–14	2015–16
Ballymena Showgrounds	1	2011–12	2011–12
Seaview	1	2016–17	2016–17
