= 2010–11 IFA Championship =

IFA Championship
- Season: 2010–11

The 2010–11 IFA Championship (known as the Ladbrokes.com Championship for sponsorship reasons) was the third season since its establishment after a major overhaul of the league system in Northern Ireland. The Championship was divided into two divisions, with the clubs in both divisions having intermediate status. Championship 1 served as the second tier of Northern Irish football, with Championship 2 as the third tier. Loughgall were the defending champions of Championship 1.

In Championship 1, Carrick Rangers secured the title and promotion to the Premiership on 2 May 2011, after Limavady United failed to beat Ballymoney United, leaving them 7 points behind with only two games left to play. Limavady United finished as runners-up but were ineligible for promotion as they did not gain the required licence from the IFA. As a result, the promotion/relegation play-off did not take place. Ballymoney United and Ballyclare Comrades finished in the bottom two, and were relegated to next season's Championship 2.

In Championship 2, Warrenpoint Town were playing their first ever season as an intermediate club, and they went on to win the Championship 2 title after only one season in the division. With the title came promotion to next season's Championship 1. Also promoted were Tobermore United, who finished as runners-up.

Chimney Corner finished bottom of Championship 2 for the second successive season, but avoided relegation when Dollingstown, playing in the Mid-Ulster Football League Intermediate A division (one tier below Championship 2), finished as league champions but were denied promotion to Championship 2 when they were later found to have fielded an ineligible player in eight league matches. As a result, Dollingstown were deducted all the points that they had gained in the matches the player had taken part in, demoting the club to 4th place in the final league table. The club appealed the decision and took their case all the way to the High Court, but it was dismissed. Tandragee Rovers were crowned champions of the division instead, but did not apply for entry to Championship 2. If Dollingstown had won their case they would have been promoted to Championship 2, with Chimney Corner being relegated.

== Team changes from 2009–10 ==
Promoted from Championship 1 to IFA Premiership

- Donegal Celtic (2nd in Championship 1)

Relegated from IFA Premiership to Championship 1

- Institute (12th in IFA Premiership)

Promoted from Championship 2 to Championship 1

- Harland & Wolff Welders (1st in Championship 2)
- Dergview (2nd in Championship 2)

Relegated from Championship 1 to Championship 2

- Coagh United (13th in Championship 1)
- Armagh City (14th in Championship 1)

Elected to Championship 2

- Warrenpoint Town

== Championship 1 ==
IFA Championship 1
- Champions: Carrick Rangers
- Promoted: Carrick Rangers
- Relegated: Ballyclare Comrades; Ballymoney United
- Matches played: 182
- Goals scored: 562 (3.09 per match)
- Biggest home win: Larne 7–0 Bangor
- Biggest away win: Loughgall 1–5 Bangor; Ballyclare 0–4 Larne
- Highest scoring: Limavady United 6–2 Carrick Rangers

Location of teams in the 2010–11 IFA Championship 1

=== Stadia and locations ===
Club	Stadium	Location	Capacity
Ards	Dixon Park	Ballyclare	1,800 (500 seated)
Ballinamallard United	Ferney Park	Ballinamallard	2,000 (100 seated)
Ballyclare Comrades	Dixon Park	Ballyclare	1,800 (500 seated)
Ballymoney United	Riada Stadium	Ballymoney	5,752 (218 seated)
Banbridge Town	Crystal Park	Banbridge	1,500 (100 seated)
Bangor	Clandeboye Park	Bangor	2,850 (500 seated)
Carrick Rangers	Taylors Avenue	Carrickfergus	6,000 (400 seated)
Dergview	Darragh Park	Castlederg	1,200 (100 seated)
Glebe Rangers	Riada Stadium	Ballymoney	5,752 (218 seated)
Harland & Wolff Welders	Tillysburn Park	Belfast	3,000 (100 seated)
Institute	Riverside Stadium	Drumahoe	2,350 (1,540 seated)
Larne	Inver Park	Larne	1,100 (656 seated)
Limavady United	The Showgrounds	Limavady	524 (274 seated)
Loughgall	Lakeview Park	Loughgall	3,000 (180 seated)

=== League table ===
Pos	Team	Pld	W	D	L	GF	GA	GD	Pts	Promotion or relegation
1	Carrick Rangers (C, P)	26	18	4	4	57	27	+30	58	Promotion to IFA Premiership
2	Limavady United (Note: Limavady United were ineligible for the promotion play-off, as they did not attain the required licence for promotion.)	26	15	6	5	53	27	+26	51	
3	Dergview	26	15	3	8	51	32	+19	48	
4	Bangor	26	11	8	7	45	38	+7	41	
5	Ballinamallard United	26	11	6	9	45	38	+7	39 (Note: Head-to head tiebreaker: BMD 4–2 HAR; HAR 2–2 BMD)	
6	Harland & Wolff Welders	26	11	6	9	45	38	+7	39	
7	Ards	26	9	7	10	37	42	−5	34	
8	Institute	26	10	4	12	28	43	−15	34	
9	Larne	26	8	6	12	38	41	−3	30	
10	Loughgall	26	8	6	12	37	48	−11	30	
11	Banbridge Town	26	7	7	12	31	39	−8	28	
12	Glebe Rangers	26	7	7	12	36	46	−10	28	
13	Ballymoney United (R)	26	5	8	13	31	48	−17	23	Relegation to IFA Championship 2
14	Ballyclare Comrades (R)	26	5	6	15	28	55	−27	21	Relegation to IFA Championship 2

Source: rsssf.com
Rules for classification: 1st points; 2nd goal difference; 3rd goals scored; 4th head-to-head points; 5th head-to-head goal difference
(C) Champions; (P) Promoted; (R) Relegated

=== Results ===
Each team plays every other team twice (once at home, and once away) for a total of 26 games.

Home \ Away	ARD	BMD	BCC	BMY	BBT	BGR	CRK	DGV	GBE	H&W	INS	LRN	LIM	LGL
Ards		2–2	0–3	3–3	2–1	0–1	0–0	1–1	4–3	2–1	1–1	2–0	1–1	1–2
Ballinamallard United	3–1		3–0	0–1	1–1	0–3	1–3	2–1	2–2	4–2	2–0	3–3	0–2	2–0
Ballyclare Comrades	0–1	3–2		0–0	1–0	2–1	1–2	0–3	1–3	0–3	1–2	0–4	1–4	2–1
Ballymoney United	1–1	2–2	1–1		1–2	2–2	0–1	0–2	3–0	3–2	2–3	0–2	1–1	2–0
Banbridge Town	0–1	1–0	1–1	2–0		2–2	3–2	1–2	1–2	1–3	2–3	2–0	0–0	3–1
Bangor	2–0	2–3	2–2	2–2	4–1		1–2	4–0	2–1	1–1	3–0	2–0	1–1	2–1
Carrick Rangers	3–1	2–1	3–0	3–1	3–1	3–1		2–0	3–1	1–1	3–0	3–0	1–1	3–3
Dergview	1–2	0–1	4–2	6–1	2–1	0–0	3–1		4–2	1–2	4–1	1–0	1–0	5–0
Glebe Rangers	0–3	1–0	3–3	1–2	1–3	4–0	0–4	0–2		3–2	3–0	1–1	1–2	1–2
Harland & Wolff Welders	3–2	2–2	3–2	2–1	3–0	1–1	1–0	1–2	0–0		2–3	2–2	1–2	0–1
Institute	2–1	0–2	1–1	2–1	0–0	2–0	0–2	1–0	0–1	0–2		1–3	2–1	0–0
Larne	1–3	0–3	2–0	2–1	1–1	7–0	0–2	0–2	0–0	2–3	0–3		3–2	1–3
Limavady United	2–1	3–2	2–1	5–0	2–0	0–1	6–2	5–2	1–1	1–0	2–0	0–3		3–0
Loughgall	5–1	1–2	4–0	1–0	1–1	1–5	0–3	2–2	1–1	1–2	4–1	1–1	1–4	

Source: rsssf.com
Legend: Blue = home team win; Yellow = draw; Red = away team win.

== Championship 2 ==
IFA Championship 2
- Champions: Warrenpoint Town
- Promoted: Warrenpoint Town; Tobermore United
- Matches played: 240
- Goals scored: 860 (3.58 per match)
- Biggest home win: Queen's University 7–0 Lurgan Celtic
- Biggest away win: Chimney Corner 2–8 Warrenpoint Town; Annagh United 1–7 PSNI
- Highest scoring: Chimney Corner 2–8 Warrenpoint Town; Sport & Leisure Swifts 7–3 Chimney Corner

Location of teams in the 2010–11 IFA Championship 2
Location of the Belfast-based teams in the 2010–11 IFA Championship 2

=== Stadia and locations ===
Club	Stadium	Location	Capacity
Annagh United	Tandragee Road	Portadown	1,250 (100 seated)
Armagh City	Holm Park	Armagh	3,000 (330 seated)
Chimney Corner	Allen Park	Antrim	2,000 (100 seated)
Coagh United	Hagan Park	Coagh	2,000 (179 seated)
Dundela	Wilgar Park	Belfast	2,500 (100 seated)
Killymoon Rangers	Mid Ulster Sports Arena	Cookstown	1,000 (100 seated)
Knockbreda	Upper Braniel	Knockbreda	1,000 (100 seated)
Lurgan Celtic	Knockrammer Park	Lurgan	1,000 (100 seated)
Moyola Park	Mill Meadow	Castledawson	1,000 (200 seated)
Portstewart	Seahaven	Portstewart	1,000 (100 seated)
PSNI	Newforge Lane	Belfast	500 (112 seated)
Queen's University	Newforge Lane	Belfast	500 (112 seated)
Sport & Leisure Swifts	Glen Road Heights	Belfast	500 (215 seated)
Tobermore United	Fortwilliam Park	Tobermore	1,500 (100 seated)
Wakehurst	Mill Meadow	Castledawson	1,000 (200 seated)
Warrenpoint Town	Milltown Playing Fields	Warrenpoint	500 (100 seated)

=== League table ===
Pos	Team	Pld	W	D	L	GF	GA	GD	Pts	Promotion
1	Warrenpoint Town (C, P)	30	22	7	1	84	26	+58	73	Promotion to IFA Championship 1
2	Tobermore United (P)	30	20	4	6	67	36	+31	64	Promotion to IFA Championship 1
3	Knockbreda	30	19	5	6	59	32	+27	62	
4	Dundela	30	16	9	5	74	41	+33	57	
5	Queen's University	30	17	4	9	61	35	+26	55	
6	Coagh United	30	16	6	8	66	48	+18	54	
7	Wakehurst	30	13	7	10	62	54	+8	46	
8	Sport & Leisure Swifts	30	12	6	12	52	58	−6	42	
9	Portstewart	30	12	2	16	51	52	−1	38	
10	PSNI	30	11	4	15	56	58	−2	37	
11	Lurgan Celtic	30	9	6	15	48	62	−14	33	
12	Armagh City	30	8	9	13	43	60	−17	33	
13	Annagh United	30	7	5	18	34	66	−32	26	
14	Killymoon Rangers	30	5	9	16	37	64	−27	24	
15	Moyola Park	30	6	5	19	31	67	−36	23	
16	Chimney Corner	30	1	4	25	35	101	−66	7	

Source: rsssf.com
Rules for classification: 1st points; 2nd goal difference; 3rd goals scored; 4th head-to-head points; 5th head-to-head goal difference
(C) Champions; (P) Promoted

=== Results ===
Each team plays every other team twice (once at home, and once away) for a total of 30 games.

Home \ Away	ANN	ARM	CHI	COA	DND	KMR	KNB	LGC	MOY	PST	PSNI	QUE	SLS	TOB	WAK	WPT
Annagh United		1–2	2–2	0–4	0–2	0–1	2–2	2–1	4–1	1–0	1–7	3–1	1–3	0–2	0–2	0–3
Armagh City	2–0		1–0	1–3	1–1	1–1	0–1	1–0	1–2	1–2	1–3	1–5	1–4	0–1	1–1	0–2
Chimney Corner	2–3	2–3		0–3	2–4	1–1	3–3	1–3	2–4	3–1	0–0	1–5	1–3	1–4	1–4	2–8
Coagh United	3–3	2–4	1–0		2–2	5–0	1–0	4–3	1–0	0–1	2–1	2–1	1–2	1–3	5–1	0–2
Dundela	3–1	4–1	7–1	4–1		2–0	0–1	3–0	3–0	3–0	4–2	2–3	3–4	4–3	4–2	1–1
Killymoon Rangers	1–2	2–2	1–0	1–2	3–3		2–2	2–2	0–0	5–4	0–3	0–2	7–2	1–3	1–1	0–2
Knockbreda	1–2	2–0	3–0	3–4	2–2	2–1		4–1	3–0	2–1	4–1	1–1	4–0	3–0	1–0	2–1
Lurgan Celtic	4–0	1–1	2–1	0–1	2–4	2–2	1–3		3–1	5–3	1–1	1–4	1–1	0–1	3–4	1–3
Moyola Park	1–0	2–2	3–2	1–5	0–3	2–1	1–2	0–2		0–0	2–3	0–2	4–2	0–3	0–5	1–2
Portstewart	4–0	2–1	3–0	2–3	3–0	5–0	1–2	2–1	1–0		0–1	0–2	4–3	0–2	3–1	1–2
PSNI	1–0	3–4	5–0	3–3	1–2	2–0	1–2	1–2	4–2	3–2		1–2	0–0	3–2	2–4	1–3
Queen's University	4–4	2–2	3–0	3–1	2–1	1–2	1–0	7–0	1–1	2–3	1–0		1–0	0–2	0–1	0–2
Sport & Leisure Swifts	1–0	1–4	7–3	1–1	2–2	1–0	0–1	2–0	2–0	1–1	2–1	0–1		0–4	4–1	1–4
Tobermore United	3–1	2–2	3–1	1–1	0–0	1–0	2–1	1–3	4–0	3–2	5–2	0–3	1–0		4–0	2–4
Wakehurst	2–0	2–2	7–2	3–3	0–0	4–2	1–2	2–3	2–1	1–0	2–0	3–1	1–1	1–3		2–3
Warrenpoint Town	1–1	6–0	4–1	2–1	1–1	5–0	2–0	0–0	2–2	4–0	5–0	1–0	5–2	2–2	2–2	

Source: rsssf.com
Legend: Blue = home team win; Yellow = draw; Red = away team win.
