= 2013–14 NIFL Championship =

NIFL Championship
- Season: 2013–14

The 2013–14 NIFL Championship (known as the Belfast Telegraph Championship for sponsorship reasons) was the sixth season since its establishment after a major overhaul of the league system in Northern Ireland. This was the first season that the league was operated by the Northern Ireland Football League (NIFL), which took over from the Irish Football Association (IFA) for the 2013–14 season onwards. The season began on 9 August 2013 and ended on 10 May 2014.

Institute won the Championship 1 title, winning promotion back to the top flight for the first time since the 2009–10 season. In the bottom two, Limavady United and Coagh United were relegated to Championship 2. Armagh City and PSNI replaced them in Championship 1, after finishing first and second in Championship 2. For the first time since the Championship was inaugurated in 2008, a club was relegated to regional football. Killymoon Rangers finished bottom of Championship 2 and were relegated to a regional division for the following season. Also leaving Championship 2 was Chimney Corner. In July 2014, the club announced that they would be resigning from the Championship to join the Ballymena & Provincial League for the following season.

== Team changes from 2012–13 ==
Ards were last season's winners of Championship 1, achieving promotion to the 2013–14 NIFL Premiership. Lisburn Distillery replaced them for this season's Championship 1, after finishing in 12th place in the previous season's Premiership. Championship 1 runners-up Warrenpoint Town were also promoted, by defeating Donegal Celtic on the away goals rule after the promotion/relegation play-off ended 2–2 on aggregate.

As a result of Newry City's expulsion the previous season, only the 13th-placed club, Tobermore United, were relegated to Championship 2. Championship 2 winners Knockbreda and runners-up Ballyclare Comrades were both promoted to Championship 1. The last remaining place in Championship 2 was filled by the winner of a two-legged promotion play-off between Mid-Ulster Football League champions Dollingstown and Northern Amateur Football League champions Newington YC. Newington YC won the play-off on the away goals rule after the tie ended 4–4 on aggregate, to gain promotion to Championship 2 for the first time.

Promoted from Championship 1 to the Premiership

- Ards (1st in Championship 1)
- Warrenpoint Town (2nd in Championship 1 - play-off winners)

Relegated from the Premiership to Championship 1

- Donegal Celtic (11th in IFA Premiership - play-off losers)
- Lisburn Distillery (12th in IFA Premiership)

Promoted from Championship 2 to Championship 1

- Knockbreda (1st in Championship 2)
- Ballyclare Comrades (2nd in Championship 2)

Relegated from Championship 1 to Championship 2

- Tobermore United (13th in Championship 1)

Promoted from Northern Amateur Football League to Championship 2

- Newington YC (1st in NAFL Premier Division - promoted via play-off)

== Championship 1 ==
NIFL Championship 1
- Champions: Institute
- Promoted: Institute
- Relegated: Coagh United; Limavady United
- Matches played: 182
- Goals scored: 661 (3.63 per match)
- Biggest home win: D. Celtic 6–1 Coagh; Institute 6–1 Larne; Dergview 5–0 Bangor; Bangor 5–0 Coagh; Bangor 6–1 Loughgall
- Biggest away win: Coagh 1–6 Carrick; Dergview 0–5 Knockbreda; Limavady 0–5 Institute; Limavady 0–5 Carrick; Coagh 1–6 Bangor; D. Celtic 0–5 Institute; D. Celtic 1–6 Ballyclare
- Highest scoring: Loughgall 5–5 Institute; Loughgall 6–4 Ballyclare

=== Stadia and locations ===
Location of teams in the 2013–14 NIFL Championship 1
Location of the Belfast-based teams in the 2013–14 NIFL Championship 1

Club	Stadium	Location	Capacity
Ballyclare Comrades	Dixon Park	Ballyclare	1,800 (500 seated)
Bangor	Clandeboye Park	Bangor	2,850 (500 seated)
Carrick Rangers	Taylors Avenue	Carrickfergus	6,000 (400 seated)
Coagh United	Hagan Park	Coagh	2,000 (179 seated)
Dergview	Darragh Park	Castlederg	1,200 (100 seated)
Donegal Celtic	Donegal Celtic Park	Belfast	2,330 (650 seated)
Dundela	Wilgar Park	Belfast	2,500 (100 seated)
Harland & Wolff Welders	Tillysburn Park	Belfast	3,000 (100 seated)
Institute	Riverside Stadium	Drumahoe	3,110 (1,540 seated)
Knockbreda	Breda Park	Knockbreda	1,000 (100 seated)
Larne	Inver Park	Larne	1,100 (656 seated)
Limavady United	The Showgrounds	Limavady	524 (174 seated)
Lisburn Distillery	New Grosvenor Stadium	Ballyskeagh	7,000 (540 seated)
Loughgall	Lakeview Park	Loughgall	3,000 (180 seated)

=== League table ===
Pos	Team	Pld	W	D	L	GF	GA	GD	Pts	Promotion or relegation
1	Institute (C, P)	26	15	9	2	72	35	+37	54	Promotion to NIFL Premiership
2	Bangor (Note: Bangor were ineligible for the promotion play-off, as they did not attain the required licence for promotion.)	26	16	5	5	65	39	+26	53	
3	Knockbreda	26	14	4	8	57	36	+21	46	
4	Dundela	26	14	4	8	65	47	+18	46	
5	Carrick Rangers	26	14	4	8	52	34	+18	46	
6	Harland & Wolff Welders	26	11	8	7	46	34	+12	41	
7	Ballyclare Comrades	26	10	4	12	53	50	+3	34	
8	Loughgall	26	9	6	11	48	56	−8	33	
9	Larne	26	9	5	12	32	47	−15	32	
10	Lisburn Distillery	26	8	7	11	43	49	−6	31	
11	Donegal Celtic	26	8	5	13	41	55	−14	29	
12	Dergview	26	6	8	12	30	46	−16	26	
13	Coagh United (R)	26	5	6	15	38	74	−36	21	Relegation to NIFL Championship 2
14	Limavady United (R)	26	4	3	19	19	59	−40	15	Relegation to NIFL Championship 2

Source: rsssf.com
Rules for classification: 1st points; 2nd goal difference; 3rd goals scored; 4th head-to-head points; 5th head-to-head goal difference
(C) Champions; (P) Promoted; (R) Relegated

=== Results ===
Each team will play every other team twice (once at home, and once away) for a total of 26 games.

Home \ Away	BCC	BGR	CRK	COA	DGV	DGC	DND	H&W	INS	KNB	LRN	LIM	LIS	LGL
Ballyclare Comrades		0–1	0–1	1–2	2–0	1–1	5–3	2–2	5–1	2–5	4–0	3–2	0–3	2–0
Bangor	4–0		0–3	5–0	2–1	1–0	3–2	1–1	0–1	2–0	3–2	3–1	6–2	6–1
Carrick Rangers	4–2	2–2		1–0	3–1	3–4	0–1	3–2	1–2	3–0	1–2	1–0	3–1	1–2
Coagh United	0–2	1–6	1–6		2–3	3–1	0–2	2–2	1–1	2–3	1–1	2–1	4–4	2–3
Dergview	1–5	5–0	2–1	0–0		2–1	2–3	0–0	1–1	0–5	1–2	0–0	3–3	1–1
Donegal Celtic	1–6	1–4	0–0	6–1	0–1		5–3	0–3	0–5	1–0	1–1	2–1	1–1	4–2
Dundela	3–0	5–1	1–1	2–3	2–2	3–2		0–2	1–1	4–0	0–1	1–0	2–0	2–1
Harland & Wolff Welders	1–1	2–2	1–2	4–0	2–0	0–2	3–6		0–1	1–1	1–0	3–0	3–3	1–2
Institute	3–2	2–2	5–1	6–2	4–0	4–2	4–0	3–1		0–0	6–1	2–0	2–1	1–1
Knockbreda	2–0	3–0	3–1	5–1	1–2	4–1	5–4	0–1	2–2		1–0	4–0	2–2	3–1
Larne	0–1	0–4	1–2	3–3	2–1	1–1	0–2	0–3	4–3	1–5		5–1	1–0	2–0
Limavady United	3–3	1–2	0–5	1–0	1–0	2–1	0–4	1–3	0–5	1–2	0–0		1–0	1–2
Lisburn Distillery	1–0	1–3	1–1	1–3	2–0	2–0	3–6	0–1	2–2	3–1	1–2	2–0		2–1
Loughgall	6–4	2–2	0–2	4–2	1–1	1–3	3–3	2–3	5–5	1–0	1–0	4–1	1–2	

Source: rsssf.com
Legend: Blue = home team win; Yellow = draw; Red = away team win.

== Championship 2 ==
NIFL Championship 2
- Champions: Armagh City
- Promoted: Armagh City; PSNI
- Relegated: Chimney Corner (resigned); Killymoon Rangers
- Matches played: 240
- Goals scored: 877 (3.65 per match)
- Biggest home win: Annagh United 9–1 Chimney Corner
- Biggest away win: Killymoon Rangers 0–7 Banbridge Town; Glebe Rangers 1–8 PSNI
- Highest scoring: Armagh City 9–2 Chimney Corner

=== Stadia and locations ===
Location of teams in the 2013–14 NIFL Championship 2
Location of the Belfast-based teams in the 2013–14 NIFL Championship 2

Club	Stadium	Location	Capacity
Annagh United	Tandragee Road	Portadown	1,250 (100 seated)
Armagh City	Holm Park	Armagh	3,000 (330 seated)
Ballymoney United	Riada Stadium	Ballymoney	5,752 (218 seated)
Banbridge Town	Crystal Park	Banbridge	1,500 (100 seated)
Chimney Corner	Allen Park	Antrim	2,000 (106 seated)
Glebe Rangers	Riada Stadium	Ballymoney	5,752 (218 seated)
Killymoon Rangers	Mid Ulster Sports Arena	Cookstown	700 (100 seated)
Lurgan Celtic	Knockrammer Park	Lurgan	1,000 (100 seated)
Moyola Park	Mill Meadow	Castledawson	1,000 (200 seated)
Newington YC	Seaview	Belfast	3,383 (all seated)
Portstewart	Seahaven	Portstewart	500 (100 seated)
PSNI	Newforge Lane	Belfast	500 (112 seated)
Queen's University	Dub Stadium	Belfast	1,000 (100 seated)
Sport & Leisure Swifts	Glen Road Heights	Belfast	500 (215 seated)
Tobermore United	Fortwilliam Park	Tobermore	1,500 (100 seated)
Wakehurst	Mill Meadow	Castledawson	1,000 (200 seated)

=== League table ===
Pos	Team	Pld	W	D	L	GF	GA	GD	Pts	Promotion or relegation
1	Armagh City (C, P)	30	25	2	3	90	26	+64	77	Promotion to NIFL Championship 1
2	PSNI (P)	30	20	6	4	84	28	+56	66	Promotion to NIFL Championship 1
3	Queen's University	30	19	6	5	47	32	+15	63	
4	Newington YC	30	15	9	6	56	32	+24	54	
5	Annagh United	30	15	7	8	75	53	+22	52	
6	Banbridge Town	30	16	2	12	60	44	+16	50	
7	Moyola Park	30	14	4	12	61	53	+8	46	
8	Portstewart	30	12	7	11	52	46	+6	43	
9	Ballymoney United	30	11	6	13	61	59	+2	39	
10	Tobermore United	30	10	4	16	47	63	−16	34	
11	Glebe Rangers	30	10	3	17	48	64	−16	33	
12	Lurgan Celtic	30	9	6	15	41	67	−26	33	
13	Wakehurst	30	7	6	17	47	75	−28	27	
14	Chimney Corner (R)	30	7	2	21	38	75	−37	23	Resigned to join Ballymena & Provincial Regional league
15	Sport & Leisure Swifts	30	5	7	18	37	70	−33	22	
16	Killymoon Rangers (R)	30	5	3	22	33	90	−57	18	Relegation to Ballymena & Provincial Regional league

Source: rsssf.com
Rules for classification: 1st points; 2nd goal difference; 3rd goals scored; 4th head-to-head points; 5th head-to-head goal difference
(C) Champions; (P) Promoted; (R) Relegated

=== Results ===
Each team plays every other team twice (once at home, and once away) for a total of 30 games.

Home \ Away	ANN	ARM	BMY	BBT	CHI	GBE	KMR	LGC	MOY	NTN	PST	PSNI	QUE	SLS	TOB	WAK
Annagh United		0–3	6–2	2–0	9–1	1–0	3–0	1–0	3–0	4–2	3–3	1–1	3–4	3–1	3–1	7–2
Armagh City	5–1		2–1	4–0	9–2	3–0	6–0	4–0	4–2	2–0	3–1	2–1	1–0	3–0	3–0	6–0
Ballymoney United	3–3	1–2		0–1	1–3	3–4	3–1	4–0	1–2	5–2	0–2	1–3	3–4	3–1	1–0	3–3
Banbridge Town	4–3	1–4	3–0		3–2	3–1	2–0	1–1	1–0	2–1	2–0	1–2	0–2	1–1	6–0	3–1
Chimney Corner	2–3	2–1	1–1	0–1		0–2	3–0	4–0	0–4	1–4	1–5	0–2	0–1	1–0	1–2	3–0
Glebe Rangers	0–3	0–2	1–2	2–1	3–2		1–0	1–3	3–5	1–1	1–2	1–8	1–2	4–0	2–4	4–0
Killymoon Rangers	1–2	0–4	1–0	0–7	4–2	3–3		3–3	1–6	0–4	0–1	2–2	0–2	2–4	2–5	5–4
Lurgan Celtic	1–1	0–1	0–4	1–4	0–1	3–2	5–1		3–0	2–2	0–5	2–0	0–1	3–3	0–2	2–1
Moyola Park	5–2	1–2	2–6	4–3	4–0	0–3	1–2	4–0		0–3	5–2	0–3	1–0	1–1	5–0	0–0
Newington YC	1–1	1–0	2–2	2–0	2–1	2–0	2–0	2–2	1–0		0–1	1–1	3–0	4–0	2–1	4–1
Portstewart	1–1	4–1	0–1	1–0	2–2	1–2	3–0	0–1	0–0	0–3		0–5	0–1	4–1	3–1	2–3
PSNI	5–0	3–3	5–1	3–1	3–0	3–1	2–0	7–0	4–0	1–2	3–2		0–0	2–0	3–2	2–3
Queen's University	2–1	2–4	2–4	2–1	2–1	1–1	3–1	3–2	0–0	0–0	1–1	0–0		1–0	3–0	2–1
Sport & Leisure Swifts	3–1	2–2	0–2	3–2	2–1	1–3	2–4	3–4	1–3	3–3	0–1	0–3	0–1		3–3	1–1
Tobermore United	0–4	1–2	0–0	0–2	3–1	3–0	2–0	2–1	2–3	0–0	2–2	0–2	2–3	4–0		2–4
Wakehurst	0–0	0–2	3–3	2–4	2–0	2–1	3–0	0–2	2–3	1–0	3–3	2–5	1–2	0–1	2–3	

Source: rsssf.com
Legend: Blue = home team win; Yellow = draw; Red = away team win.
