= 2011–12 IFA Championship =

IFA Championship
- Season: 2011–12

The 2011–12 IFA Championship (known as the Belfast Telegraph Championship for sponsorship reasons) was the fourth season since its establishment after a major overhaul of the league system in Northern Ireland. The season began on 6 August 2011, and ended on 1 May 2012.

In Championship 1, Ballinamallard United were the champions by 12 points. They achieved promotion to the top flight of Northern Irish football for the first time in their history. Newry City finished as runners-up, but were defeated 3–2 by Lisburn Distillery in the promotion/relegation play-off, losing out on promotion. Glebe Rangers and Banbridge Town finished in the bottom two and were relegated to Championship 2 for next season.

In Championship 2, Coagh United were the eventual winners, with Dundela finishing as runners-up. Both achieved promotion to next season's Championship 1. Chimney Corner avoided relegation to a lower tier regional league despite finishing bottom of Championship 2 for the third successive season. This was because none of the four regional league champions applied to enter the Championship.

== Team changes from 2010–11 ==
Carrick Rangers were last season's champions of Championship 1, achieving promotion to the 2011–12 IFA Premiership. Newry City replaced them for this season's Championship 1, after finishing in 12th place in the previous season's Premiership.

Promoted from Championship 1 to IFA Premiership

- Carrick Rangers (1st in Championship 1)

Relegated from IFA Premiership to Championship 1

- Newry City (12th in IFA Premiership)

Promoted from Championship 2 to Championship 1

- Warrenpoint Town (1st in Championship 2)
- Tobermore United (2nd in Championship 2)

Relegated from Championship 1 to Championship 2

- Ballymoney United (13th in Championship 1)
- Ballyclare Comrades (14th in Championship 1)

== Championship 1 ==
IFA Championship 1
- Champions: Ballinamallard United
- Promoted: Ballinamallard United
- Relegated: Banbridge Town; Glebe Rangers
- Matches played: 182
- Goals scored: 555 (3.05 per match)
- Biggest home win: Limavady Utd 9–0; Banbridge Town
- Biggest away win: Banbridge Town 0–6; Newry City
- Highest scoring: Limavady Utd 9–0; Banbridge Town; Banbridge Town 2–7 Ballinamallard Utd

=== Stadia and locations ===
Club	Stadium	Location	Capacity
Ards	Dixon Park	Ballyclare	1,800 (500 seated)
Ballinamallard United	Ferney Park	Ballinamallard	2,000 (100 seated)
Banbridge Town	Crystal Park	Banbridge	1,500 (100 seated)
Bangor	Clandeboye Park	Bangor	2,850 (500 seated)
Dergview	Darragh Park	Castlederg	1,200 (100 seated)
Glebe Rangers	Riada Stadium	Ballymoney	5,752 (218 seated)
Harland & Wolff Welders	Tillysburn Park	Belfast	3,000 (100 seated)
Institute	Riverside Stadium	Drumahoe	3,110 (1,540 seated)
Larne	Inver Park	Larne	1,100 (656 seated)
Limavady United	The Showgrounds	Limavady	524 (274 seated)
Loughgall	Lakeview Park	Loughgall	3,000 (180 seated)
Newry City	The Showgrounds	Newry	2,275 (1,080 seated)
Tobermore United	Fortwilliam Park	Tobermore	1,500 (100 seated)
Warrenpoint Town	Milltown Playing Fields	Warrenpoint	500 (100 seated)

Location of teams in the 2011–12 IFA Championship 1

=== League table ===
Pos	Team	Pld	W	D	L	GF	GA	GD	Pts	Promotion or relegation
1	Ballinamallard United (C, P)	26	20	3	3	62	24	+38	63	Promotion to IFA Premiership
2	Newry City	26	15	6	5	51	22	+29	51	Qualification to promotion play-off
3	Institute	26	13	4	9	37	34	+3	43	
4	Bangor	26	12	6	8	45	34	+11	42	
5	Ards	26	11	6	9	39	31	+8	39	
6	Limavady United	26	12	2	12	48	43	+5	38	
7	Loughgall	26	11	5	10	45	41	+4	38	
8	Dergview	26	8	10	8	38	37	+1	34	
9	Harland & Wolff Welders	26	10	4	12	30	35	−5	34	
10	Larne	26	9	5	12	37	47	−10	32	
11	Tobermore United	26	8	7	11	34	44	−10	31	
12	Warrenpoint Town	26	7	7	12	34	37	−3	28	
13	Banbridge Town (R)	26	5	4	17	30	70	−40	19	Relegation to IFA Championship 2
14	Glebe Rangers (R)	26	3	7	16	25	56	−31	16	Relegation to IFA Championship 2

Source: rsssf.com
Rules for classification: 1st points; 2nd goal difference; 3rd goals scored; 4th head-to-head points; 5th head-to-head goal difference
(C) Champions; (P) Promoted; (R) Relegated

=== Results ===
Each team plays every other team twice (once at home, and once away) for a total of 26 games.

Home \ Away	ARD	BMD	BBT	BGR	DGV	GBE	H&W	INS	LRN	LIM	LGL	NEW	TOB	WPT
Ards		0–5	2–0	2–0	1–2	3–0	1–1	2–0	1–1	0–2	2–3	0–0	2–0	5–1
Ballinamallard United	1–0		5–1	3–2	1–1	2–0	3–0	1–1	2–1	2–1	3–0	0–2	2–1	2–0
Banbridge Town	2–3	2–7		3–4	2–1	3–0	0–2	0–1	3–0	1–2	3–2	0–6	1–3	1–1
Bangor	0–1	1–2	4–0		1–1	0–0	2–0	2–0	1–1	1–0	2–2	3–2	5–0	1–0
Dergview	2–0	0–0	5–1	1–4		1–1	0–0	1–0	0–1	2–1	3–1	1–3	1–1	2–2
Glebe Rangers	0–3	1–3	0–3	2–2	2–2		4–1	0–0	0–3	1–4	3–5	0–3	1–2	0–1
Harland & Wolff Welders	2–2	1–3	1–1	0–2	0–2	0–1		2–1	3–1	3–0	1–0	1–2	1–0	3–1
Institute	2–0	0–3	2–1	3–4	1–0	3–2	0–1		1–0	0–2	2–1	1–1	3–2	4–3
Larne	0–2	3–2	1–1	0–2	5–2	4–2	0–2	0–2		4–2	2–3	2–0	2–1	1–1
Limavady United	3–1	0–1	9–0	3–1	2–1	3–2	3–1	0–2	3–0		0–0	1–0	2–4	0–4
Loughgall	2–1	1–4	2–0	4–0	1–1	0–1	2–0	3–4	1–1	2–2		3–2	4–0	0–2
Newry City	0–0	3–1	3–0	2–0	4–1	1–1	2–1	0–3	5–0	2–0	2–0		3–3	1–0
Tobermore United	1–4	1–2	1–1	2–1	1–1	1–1	0–2	2–0	3–1	4–2	0–2	0–0		0–0
Warrenpoint Town	1–1	1–2	3–0	0–0	1–4	3–0	2–1	1–1	2–3	4–1	0–1	0–2	0–1	

Source: rsssf.com
Legend: Blue = home team win; Yellow = draw; Red = away team win.

== Championship 2 ==
IFA Championship 2
- Champions: Coagh United
- Promoted: Coagh United; Dundela
- Matches played: 240
- Goals scored: 853 (3.55 per match)
- Biggest home win: Coagh United 7–0 Chimney Corner
- Biggest away win: Chimney Corner 0–6 Dundela
- Highest scoring: PSNI 2–7 Lurgan Celtic; Dundela 4–5 Ballyclare Comrades

=== Stadia and locations ===
Club	Stadium	Location	Capacity
Annagh United	Tandragee Road	Portadown	1,250 (100 seated)
Armagh City	Holm Park	Armagh	3,000 (330 seated)
Ballyclare Comrades	Dixon Park	Ballyclare	1,800 (500 seated)
Ballymoney United	Riada Stadium	Ballymoney	5,752 (218 seated)
Chimney Corner	Allen Park	Antrim	2,000 (100 seated)
Coagh United	Hagan Park	Coagh	2,000 (179 seated)
Dundela	Wilgar Park	Belfast	2,500 (100 seated)
Killymoon Rangers	Mid Ulster Sports Arena	Cookstown	1,000 (100 seated)
Knockbreda	Upper Braniel	Knockbreda	1,000 (100 seated)
Lurgan Celtic	Knockrammer Park	Lurgan	1,000 (100 seated)
Moyola Park	Mill Meadow	Castledawson	1,000 (200 seated)
Portstewart	Seahaven	Portstewart	1,000 (100 seated)
PSNI	Newforge Lane	Belfast	500 (112 seated)
Queen's University	Dub Stadium	Belfast	1,000 (100 seated)
Sport & Leisure Swifts	Glen Road Heights	Belfast	500 (215 seated)
Wakehurst	Mill Meadow	Castledawson	1,000 (200 seated)

Location of teams in the 2011–12 IFA Championship 2
Location of the Belfast-based teams in the 2011–12 IFA Championship 2

=== League table ===
Pos	Team	Pld	W	D	L	GF	GA	GD	Pts	Promotion
1	Coagh United (C, P)	30	19	6	5	81	41	+40	63	Promotion to IFA Championship 1
2	Dundela (P)	30	20	2	8	79	46	+33	62	Promotion to IFA Championship 1
3	Knockbreda	30	19	4	7	70	31	+39	61	
4	Lurgan Celtic	30	17	6	7	73	40	+33	57	
5	Queen's University	30	18	1	11	63	38	+25	55	
6	Ballyclare Comrades	30	16	4	10	60	46	+14	52	
7	Annagh United	30	15	6	9	59	51	+8	51	
8	Wakehurst	30	14	5	11	59	48	+11	47	
9	Ballymoney United	30	12	3	15	51	45	+6	39	
10	Portstewart	30	11	4	15	43	56	−13	37	
11	Armagh City	30	9	6	15	39	52	−13	33	
12	Sport & Leisure Swifts	30	9	5	16	46	59	−13	32	
13	PSNI	30	8	5	17	36	67	−31	29	
14	Moyola Park	30	9	2	19	34	71	−37	29	
15	Killymoon Rangers	30	7	3	20	34	72	−38	24	
16	Chimney Corner	30	5	2	23	26	90	−64	17	

Source: rsssf.com
Rules for classification: 1st points; 2nd goal difference; 3rd goals scored; 4th head-to-head points; 5th head-to-head goal difference
(C) Champions; (P) Promoted

=== Results ===
Each team plays every other team twice (once at home, and once away) for a total of 30 games.

Home \ Away	ANN	ARM	BCC	BMY	CHI	COA	DND	KMR	KNB	LGC	MOY	PST	PSNI	QUE	SLS	WAK
Annagh United		1–1	1–2	1–0	2–0	2–1	1–1	4–2	0–2	2–6	1–0	2–0	2–0	5–2	2–1	5–2
Armagh City	3–3		0–4	0–1	4–0	2–2	2–3	0–1	1–4	0–3	1–0	2–0	3–1	0–1	2–1	0–3
Ballyclare Comrades	2–0	2–2		2–1	3–1	1–3	2–0	3–0	3–1	1–3	0–2	0–1	3–0	2–1	2–3	3–2
Ballymoney United	1–2	5–0	2–3		6–1	1–1	2–1	1–0	2–0	0–1	5–0	0–2	4–3	0–2	5–3	2–3
Chimney Corner	1–2	2–1	0–2	1–0		2–6	0–6	4–2	0–1	1–0	2–4	1–0	1–1	1–5	1–4	0–5
Coagh United	2–2	3–0	3–1	3–0	7–0		3–3	2–0	2–2	2–3	5–1	2–4	2–0	4–0	1–0	4–2
Dundela	2–5	4–0	4–5	2–1	2–0	3–4		3–0	2–1	4–0	4–1	4–0	3–2	4–1	1–0	3–0
Killymoon Rangers	3–3	1–4	1–3	3–2	3–1	3–0	1–2		0–4	1–1	4–2	3–2	0–2	0–3	1–1	0–2
Knockbreda	3–0	1–0	4–2	3–1	4–0	1–2	1–0	4–0		2–4	3–0	2–3	4–0	0–1	3–1	1–1
Lurgan Celtic	4–1	0–0	2–1	2–0	5–1	2–1	2–3	4–0	4–4		6–1	2–1	2–2	1–1	0–2	0–1
Moyola Park	0–4	0–4	1–1	1–2	1–0	1–4	1–2	2–0	0–1	0–5		3–1	5–0	0–3	1–0	1–3
Portstewart	1–5	3–0	1–2	2–1	1–1	2–2	2–4	4–1	1–1	1–0	1–0		0–4	0–1	2–2	2–1
PSNI	2–0	2–1	2–2	1–1	2–1	0–2	2–1	0–1	0–4	2–7	1–1	3–2		1–3	2–1	0–4
Queen's University	3–0	0–1	2–1	1–2	6–1	2–3	4–0	2–1	1–2	1–2	5–0	1–2	4–1		1–2	1–0
Sport & Leisure Swifts	1–1	0–4	0–0	0–2	3–1	0–1	1–3	5–2	0–5	3–1	1–2	3–1	2–0	2–4		2–6
Wakehurst	3–0	1–1	3–2	1–1	2–1	1–4	2–5	2–0	0–2	1–1	2–3	3–1	1–0	0–1	2–2	

Source: rsssf.com
Legend: Blue = home team win; Yellow = draw; Red = away team win.
