= 2012–13 IFA Championship =

IFA Championship
- Season: 2012–13

The 2012–13 IFA Championship (known as the Belfast Telegraph Championship for sponsorship reasons) was the fifth season since its establishment after a major overhaul of the league system in Northern Ireland. The season began on 10 August 2012 and ended on 4 May 2013. From next season onwards, the league would be operated by the Northern Ireland Football League, which was taking over from the Irish Football Association (IFA) for the 2013–14 season.

In Championship 1, Ards were confirmed as the champions on 20 April 2013 after a 1–1 draw against Institute, securing promotion back to the top flight for the first time since the 2005–06 season. Warrenpoint Town finished as runners-up, and qualified for the promotion/relegation play-off against Donegal Celtic. The tie ended 2–2 on aggregate with Warrenpoint Town winning on the away goals rule to reach the top flight for the first time in the club's history. Donegal Celtic were relegated to next season's Championship 1. Earlier in the season, Newry City were wound up and their IFA membership was later terminated. All of their results were also expunged. As a result of Newry's expulsion from the league, only the club that finished in 13th, Tobermore United, was relegated from Championship 1, and there was no relegation from Championship 2.

In Championship 2, winners Knockbreda were promoted to Championship 1, along with runners-up Ballyclare Comrades. Chimney Corner finished bottom for the fourth successive season but were saved from relegation by Newry City's demise.

== Team changes from 2011–12 ==
Ballinamallard United were last season's winners of Championship 1, achieving promotion to the 2012–13 IFA Premiership. Carrick Rangers replaced them for this season's Championship 1, after finishing in 12th place in the previous season's Premiership. Newry City missed out on promotion as they finished as runners-up, but were defeated 3–2 by Lisburn Distillery in the promotion/relegation play-off.

Promoted from Championship 1 to IFA Premiership

- Ballinamallard United (1st in Championship 1)

Relegated from IFA Premiership to Championship 1

- Carrick Rangers (12th in IFA Premiership)

Promoted from Championship 2 to Championship 1

- Coagh United (1st in Championship 2)
- Dundela (2nd in Championship 2)

Relegated from Championship 1 to Championship 2

- Banbridge Town (13th in Championship 1)
- Glebe Rangers (14th in Championship 1)

Club dissolved

- Newry City

== Championship 1 ==
IFA Championship 1
- Champions: Ards
- Promoted: Ards; Warrenpoint Town
- Relegated: Tobermore United
- Matches: 156
- Goals: 507 (3.25 per match)
- Biggest home win: Carrick Rangers 6–0 Dergview
- Biggest away win: Larne 0–6 Carrick Rangers
- Highest scoring: Larne 3–5 Dundela; Tobermore United 2–6 Institute; Tobermore United 4–4 Larne; Warrenpoint Town 5–3 Dundela; Dundela 5–3 Carrick Rangers; Dundela 4–4 Limavady United

=== Stadia and locations ===
Location of teams in the 2012–13 IFA Championship 1

Club	Stadium	Location	Capacity
Ards	Clandeboye Park	Bangor	2,850 (500 seated)
Bangor	Clandeboye Park	Bangor	2,850 (500 seated)
Carrick Rangers	Taylors Avenue	Carrickfergus	6,000 (400 seated)
Coagh United	Hagan Park	Coagh	2,000 (179 seated)
Dergview	Darragh Park	Castlederg	1,200 (100 seated)
Dundela	Wilgar Park	Belfast	2,500 (100 seated)
Harland & Wolff Welders	Tillysburn Park	Belfast	3,000 (100 seated)
Institute	Riverside Stadium	Drumahoe	3,110 (1,540 seated)
Larne	Inver Park	Larne	1,100 (656 seated)
Limavady United	The Showgrounds	Limavady	524 (274 seated)
Loughgall	Lakeview Park	Loughgall	3,000 (180 seated)
Tobermore United	Fortwilliam Park	Tobermore	1,500 (100 seated)
Warrenpoint Town	Milltown Playing Fields	Warrenpoint	500 (100 seated)

=== League table ===
Pos	Team	Pld	W	D	L	GF	GA	GD	Pts	Promotion or relegation
1	Ards (C, P)	24	18	5	1	56	19	+37	59	Promotion to NIFL Premiership
2	Warrenpoint Town (O, P)	24	15	5	4	46	23	+23	50	Qualification to promotion play-off
3	Institute	24	14	5	5	50	23	+27	47	
4	Dundela	24	13	4	7	62	51	+11	43	
5	Carrick Rangers	24	11	6	7	48	32	+16	39	
6	Harland & Wolff Welders	24	10	4	10	37	35	+2	34	
7	Dergview	24	7	6	11	27	39	−12	27	
8	Larne	24	5	9	10	24	40	−16	24	
9	Coagh United	24	6	5	13	35	51	−16	23	
10	Bangor	24	6	5	13	23	42	−19	23	
11	Loughgall	24	6	5	13	27	48	−21	23	
12	Limavady United	24	5	6	13	34	49	−15	21	
13	Tobermore United (R)	24	6	3	15	38	55	−17	21	Relegation to NIFL Championship 2 (Note: As a result of Newry City dissolving, only the 13th-placed club was relegated.)

Source: rsssf.com
Rules for classification: 1st points; 2nd goal difference; 3rd goals scored; 4th head-to-head points; 5th head-to-head goal difference
(C) Champions; (O) Play-off winners; (P) Promoted; (R) Relegated

=== Results ===
Each team plays every other team twice (once at home, and once away) for a total of 24 games.

Home \ Away	ARD	BGR	CRK	COA	DGV	DND	H&W	INS	LRN	LIM	LGL	TOB	WPT
Ards		1–0	1–0	2–0	2–0	5–2	2–1	1–1	2–1	4–0	3–2	2–0	2–0
Bangor	0–2		1–2	2–3	1–0	2–3	0–2	0–3	3–0	1–1	2–1	1–0	0–3
Carrick Rangers	1–1	1–2		2–0	6–0	3–0	1–0	2–2	1–1	2–0	0–0	5–0	2–1
Coagh United	1–5	3–1	2–3		0–1	0–3	1–1	1–2	3–0	3–3	3–1	2–3	1–4
Dergview	0–0	0–0	0–0	3–0		1–3	4–1	1–1	1–3	2–1	1–1	2–1	1–3
Dundela	2–2	5–1	5–3	0–5	4–0		2–3	2–1	1–1	4–4	1–2	4–2	1–0
Harland & Wolff Welders	2–3	4–1	1–2	5–1	3–1	2–1		0–2	0–0	2–3	0–2	2–0	1–1
Institute	2–2	0–1	5–0	2–3	2–0	0–0	2–0		2–0	1–0	2–0	3–2	1–2
Larne	1–2	0–0	0–6	0–0	1–1	3–5	1–2	0–4		2–0	0–0	1–0	1–1
Limavady United	0–5	3–1	3–1	1–1	0–2	3–4	0–1	1–2	0–1		5–2	2–0	0–2
Loughgall	0–4	1–1	2–1	3–1	0–4	1–4	4–2	1–3	2–0	1–1		0–1	1–4
Tobermore United	0–2	3–1	4–3	1–1	4–2	2–3	1–2	2–6	4–4	3–3	3–0		0–1
Warrenpoint Town	3–1	1–1	1–1	3–0	2–0	5–3	0–0	2–1	0–3	2–0	2–0	3–2	

Source: rsssf.com
Legend: Blue = home team win; Yellow = draw; Red = away team win.

== Championship 2 ==
IFA Championship 2
- Champions: Knockbreda
- Promoted: Knockbreda; Ballyclare Comrades
- Matches: 240
- Goals: 905 (3.77 per match)
- Biggest home win: Armagh City 11–1 Chimney Corner
- Biggest away win: Sport & Leisure Swifts 1–8 Knockbreda; Chimney Corner 0–7 Lurgan Celtic
- Highest scoring: Armagh City 11–1 Chimney Corner

=== Stadia and locations ===
Location of teams in the 2012–13 IFA Championship 2
Location of the Belfast-based teams in the 2012–13 IFA Championship 2

Club	Stadium	Location	Capacity
Annagh United	Tandragee Road	Portadown	1,250 (100 seated)
Armagh City	Holm Park	Armagh	3,000 (330 seated)
Ballyclare Comrades	Dixon Park	Ballyclare	1,800 (500 seated)
Ballymoney United	Riada Stadium	Ballymoney	5,752 (218 seated)
Banbridge Town	Crystal Park	Banbridge	1,500 (100 seated)
Chimney Corner	Allen Park	Antrim	2,000 (100 seated)
Glebe Rangers	Riada Stadium	Ballymoney	5,752 (218 seated)
Killymoon Rangers	Mid Ulster Sports Arena	Cookstown	1,000 (100 seated)
Knockbreda	Breda Park	Knockbreda	1,000 (100 seated)
Lurgan Celtic	Knockrammer Park	Lurgan	1,000 (100 seated)
Moyola Park	Mill Meadow	Castledawson	2,000 (200 seated)
Portstewart	Seahaven	Portstewart	1,000 (100 seated)
PSNI	Newforge Lane	Belfast	500 (112 seated)
Queen's University	Dub Stadium	Belfast	1,000 (100 seated)
Sport & Leisure Swifts	Glen Road Heights	Belfast	500 (215 seated)
Wakehurst	Mill Meadow	Castledawson	1,000 (200 seated)

=== League table ===
Pos	Team	Pld	W	D	L	GF	GA	GD	Pts	Promotion
1	Knockbreda (C, P)	30	25	2	3	106	25	+81	77	Promotion to NIFL Championship 1
2	Ballyclare Comrades (P)	30	23	2	5	77	28	+49	71	Promotion to NIFL Championship 1
3	Armagh City	30	21	3	6	81	34	+47	66	
4	Lurgan Celtic	30	20	3	7	71	43	+28	63	
5	Glebe Rangers	30	15	7	8	58	41	+17	52	
6	Wakehurst	30	16	4	10	61	50	+11	52	
7	Queen's University	30	13	6	11	65	43	+22	45	
8	PSNI	30	14	1	15	60	48	+12	43	
9	Banbridge Town	30	11	7	12	57	58	−1	40	
10	Ballymoney United	30	10	7	13	53	67	−14	37	
11	Annagh United	30	9	7	14	39	53	−14	34	
12	Moyola Park	30	6	10	14	35	51	−16	28	
13	Portstewart	30	5	7	18	37	70	−33	22	
14	Sport & Leisure Swifts	30	5	5	20	41	101	−60	20	
15	Killymoon Rangers	30	4	7	19	38	85	−47	19	
16	Chimney Corner	30	3	2	25	26	108	−82	11	No Relegation (Note: As a result of Newry City dissolving, there was no relegation from Championship 2.)

Source: rsssf.com
Rules for classification: 1st points; 2nd goal difference; 3rd goals scored; 4th head-to-head points; 5th head-to-head goal difference
(C) Champions; (P) Promoted

=== Results ===
Each team plays every other team twice (once at home, and once away) for a total of 30 games.

Home \ Away	ANN	ARM	BCC	BMY	BBT	CHI	GBE	KMR	KNB	LGC	MOY	PST	PSNI	QUE	SLS	WAK
Annagh United		1–1	0–2	0–0	1–4	2–2	0–1	2–0	1–4	0–2	1–1	3–1	1–3	1–1	0–1	1–4
Armagh City	2–1		1–0	7–1	1–0	11–1	3–0	5–1	2–5	1–0	1–0	2–0	1–3	2–1	7–2	3–1
Ballyclare Comrades	3–1	2–0		0–2	2–1	4–1	1–1	2–0	1–0	2–1	1–2	2–0	2–1	2–1	6–0	2–0
Ballymoney United	1–1	1–5	1–4		2–3	5–1	1–0	4–1	1–1	0–2	1–1	4–0	1–1	0–5	4–1	0–4
Banbridge Town	1–2	0–2	3–2	3–1		5–0	0–2	4–1	0–4	2–2	2–2	6–2	3–2	0–2	3–3	0–1
Chimney Corner	1–2	0–4	2–6	3–2	1–2		1–2	2–1	0–3	0–7	2–1	1–2	1–6	0–4	0–6	0–4
Glebe Rangers	3–1	4–1	2–4	0–0	6–2	1–0		4–0	1–1	0–4	3–1	4–4	1–0	2–3	1–1	1–1
Killymoon Rangers	0–1	0–5	1–6	1–5	3–2	2–2	3–5		1–3	4–3	2–2	1–1	1–2	2–2	4–2	1–0
Knockbreda	6–1	1–0	1–2	6–1	4–0	5–0	3–1	2–1		8–0	3–0	8–0	2–1	6–2	4–1	4–2
Lurgan Celtic	2–2	4–1	2–1	3–1	3–0	3–0	2–1	3–1	0–3		1–0	5–2	2–1	1–0	5–0	2–5
Moyola Park	1–4	0–1	0–2	6–1	1–1	3–2	1–1	0–0	2–4	0–2		1–0	1–2	1–1	3–3	0–1
Portstewart	0–2	0–0	0–4	2–3	1–1	3–0	0–2	7–3	0–1	2–2	0–0		1–2	2–2	2–0	0–2
PSNI	0–2	1–3	1–5	2–3	1–2	2–0	1–3	4–0	1–3	3–1	0–1	3–1		0–1	4–0	7–2
Queen's University	1–0	1–2	2–2	3–1	0–3	5–0	0–3	0–0	1–3	0–1	5–0	4–1	1–3		7–0	3–1
Sport & Leisure Swifts	1–2	2–6	0–2	0–5	2–2	3–2	1–0	3–3	1–8	1–2	1–4	1–3	2–1	0–4		2–5
Wakehurst	4–3	1–1	1–3	1–1	2–2	2–1	1–3	2–0	1–0	2–4	3–0	1–0	1–2	4–3	2–1	

Source: rsssf.com
Legend: Blue = home team win; Yellow = draw; Red = away team win.
