= NCL Premier (Northern Ireland) =

- Organising body: Northern Amateur Football League
- Founded: 2026
- Country: Northern Ireland
- Number of clubs: 12
- Level on pyramid: 3
- Promotion to: NIFL Championship
- Relegation to: NCL League One (to be created in 2027)
- Domestic cup: Irish Cup
- League cup: National Conference League Cup
- Current champions: Moyola Park (2025–26 NIFL Premier Intermediate League)
- Current: 2026–27 season

The National Conference League Premier is the third level of the Northern Ireland football league system below the NIFL Premiership (level 1) and NIFL Championship (level 2). It was created in 2026, following abolishment of the NIFL Premier Intermediate League, and is operated by the Northern Amateur Football League.

== History ==
The third level in Northern Irish football was known as the Irish League Second Division from 1999 to 2003, the Irish Second Division from 2003 to 2008, the IFA Interim Intermediate League from 2008 to 2009, the IFA Championship 2 from 2009 to 2013, the NIFL Championship 2 from 2013 to 2016.

Under reforms agreed by the NIFL clubs in 2014, from 2016, when the previous Championship 1 acquired senior status, Championship 2 continued as the NIFL Premier Intermediate League, retaining its intermediate status and thus became the top intermediate league in Northern Ireland.

In May 2023, the league was expanded to 14 teams, due to licensing issues with Warrenpoint Town and PSNI not having a league they can seamlessly be relegated into. Rathfriland Rangers joined the league for the 2023-24 season, along with Coagh United.

In 2026, the NIFL Premier Intermediate League that had been operated by the Northern Ireland Football League, was replaced by the National Conference League (NCL) Premier under operation of the Northern Amateur Football League. Further NCL divisions, League One and League Two, which would become the fourth and the fifth tiers of football in Northern Ireland, are set to be created in 2027.

== Current members ==
Club	Stadium	Location
Ballyclare Comrades	Dixon Park	Ballyclare
Ballymacash Rangers	The Bluebell Stadium	Lisburn
Banbridge Town	Crystal Park	Banbridge
Coagh United	Hagan Park	Coagh
Dergview	Darragh Park	Castlederg
Dollingstown	Planters Park	Dollingstown
Knockbreda	Breda Park	Belfast
Lisburn Distillery	New Grosvenor Stadium	Lisburn
Oxford Sunnyside	Knockramer Park	Lurgan
Portstewart	Mullaghacall	Portstewart
Rosario Y.C.	Ulidia Playing Fields	Belfast
St James' Swifts	Donegal Celtic Park	Belfast

== List of third-tier champions ==
League / Division	Season	Champions
Irish League Second Division	1999–00	Dundela
Irish League Second Division	2000–01	Dundela
Irish League Second Division	2001–02	Moyola Park
Irish League Second Division	2002–03	Ballinamallard United
Irish Second Division	2003–04	Coagh United
Irish Second Division	2004–05	Tobermore United
Irish Second Division	2005–06	Portstewart
Irish Second Division	2006–07	Ballyclare Comrades
Irish Second Division	2007–08	Dergview
IFA Interim Intermediate League	2008–09	Harland & Wolff Welders
IFA Championship 2	2009–10	Harland & Wolff Welders
IFA Championship 2	2010–11	Warrenpoint Town
IFA Championship 2	2011–12	Coagh United
IFA Championship 2	2012–13	Knockbreda
NIFL Championship 2	2013–14	Armagh City
NIFL Championship 2	2014–15	Lurgan Celtic
NIFL Championship 2	2015–16	Limavady United
NIFL Premier; Intermediate League	2016–17	Limavady United
NIFL Premier; Intermediate League	2017–18	Dundela
NIFL Premier; Intermediate League	2018–19	Queen's University
NIFL Premier; Intermediate League	2019–20	Annagh United
NIFL Premier; Intermediate League	2021–22	Newington
NIFL Premier; Intermediate League	2022–23	Bangor
NIFL Premier; Intermediate League	2023–24	Limavady United
NIFL Premier; Intermediate League	2024–25	Warrenpoint Town
NIFL Premier; Intermediate League	2025–26	Moyola Park

== Links ==
- National Conference League. The official website of the Northern Amateur Football League.
- Northern Ireland Conference League.
