= 2012–13 IFA Premiership =

Annual soccer tournament

IFA Premiership
- Season: 2012–13
- Champions: Cliftonville; 1st Premiership title 4th Irish title
- Relegated: Donegal Celtic; Lisburn Distillery
- Champions League: Cliftonville
- Europa League: Glentoran (via Irish Cup); Crusaders; Linfield
- Matches played: 228
- Goals scored: 684 (3 per match)
- Top goalscorer: Liam Boyce (29 goals)
- Biggest home win: Glenavon 7–0 Ballymena United; Glenavon 7–0 Lisburn Distillery
- Biggest away win: Ballymena United 0–8 Cliftonville
- Highest scoring: Glentoran 4–5 Crusaders
- Highest attendance: 5,458; Linfield 2–1 Glentoran (26 December 2012)
- Lowest attendance: 39; Donegal Celtic 2–1; Dungannon Swifts (16 April 2013)
- Average attendance: 828

The 2012–13 IFA Premiership (known as the Danske Bank Premiership for sponsorship reasons) was the 5th season of the IFA Premiership, the highest level of league football in Northern Ireland, and the 112th season of Irish league football overall.

Cliftonville were champions, winning the league for the 4th time.

== Summary ==
The season began on 11 August 2012 and ended on 27 April 2013. This was the last season of the league under the control of the Irish Football Association. From the following season onwards, the league became part of the newly created Northern Ireland Football League.

Linfield were the defending champions after winning their third consecutive title – their 51st league title overall last season. This season however, Cliftonville were the champions for the fourth time overall and the first time since the 1997–98 season. It was also the first time in eleven years that neither Linfield or Glentoran had won the title, with the previous occasion being 2001–02 when Portadown won their fourth title.

Lisburn Distillery finished bottom of the table and were relegated to Championship 1 after a 2–0 defeat to Ballymena United on 16 April 2013. The club had participated in all 112 seasons of senior football so far, and at the time were one of only four clubs to have done so; the others being Cliftonville, Linfield and Glentoran. The club had not been outside the top division since winning the 2001–02 Irish League First Division title, which at the time was the second tier of senior football. However, the restructuring of the league system in 2003 consolidated senior football into one division, which meant that this was the first time in the club's history that they had been relegated to intermediate football. This brought an end to both their 123-year stay in senior football, and their 11-year stay in the top flight. 11th-placed Donegal Celtic joined them in Championship 1, after losing on the away goals rule to Warrenpoint Town in the Promotion/relegation play-off following a 2–2 draw on aggregate. This was the first time since the 2005–06 season that two clubs had been promoted to, and relegated from the top flight.

== Teams ==
2011–12 Championship 1 winners Ballinamallard United were promoted to this season's Premiership after successfully gaining the required Championship Club Licence from the IFA. Last season's bottom-placed Premiership club Carrick Rangers replaced them in Championship 1 after only one season in the top flight.

Championship 1 runners-up Newry City lost out on promotion, as last season's 11th placed club Lisburn Distillery defeated them 3–2 on aggregate in the Promotion/relegation play-off.

=== Stadia and locations ===
Location of teams in the 2012–13 IFA Premiership
Location of the Belfast-based teams in the 2012–13 IFA Premiership

Club	Stadium	Location	Capacity
Ballinamallard United	Ferney Park	Ballinamallard	2,000 (250 seated)
Ballymena United	The Showgrounds	Ballymena	3,050 (all seated)
Cliftonville	Solitude	Belfast	2,530 (all seated)
Coleraine	The Showgrounds	Coleraine	2,496 (1,106 seated)
Crusaders	Seaview	Belfast	3,383 (all seated)
Donegal Celtic	Donegal Celtic Park	Belfast	2,330 (650 seated)
Dungannon Swifts	Stangmore Park	Dungannon	5,000 (600 seated)
Glenavon	Mourneview Park	Lurgan	4,160 (4,000 seated)
Glentoran	The Oval	Belfast	5,056 (3,991 seated)
Linfield	Windsor Park	Belfast	12,342 (all seated)
Lisburn Distillery	New Grosvenor Stadium	Ballyskeagh	7,000 (540 seated)
Portadown	Shamrock Park	Portadown	3,940 (2,740 seated)

== League table ==
Pos	Team	Pld	W	D	L	GF	GA	GD	Pts	Qualification or relegation
1	Cliftonville (C)	38	29	4	5	95	38	+57	91	Qualification to Champions League second qualifying round
2	Crusaders	38	26	5	7	82	41	+41	83	Qualification to Europa League first qualifying round (Note: Glentoran also qualified for the 2013–14 UEFA Europa League first qualifying round by winning the 2012–13 Irish Cup.)
3	Linfield	38	17	11	10	69	48	+21	62	Qualification to Europa League first qualifying round
4	Glentoran	38	15	12	11	63	44	+19	57	Qualification to Europa League first qualifying round
5	Ballinamallard United	38	15	8	15	49	43	+6	53	
6	Coleraine	38	13	14	11	50	57	−7	53	
7	Portadown	38	15	10	13	55	55	0	55 (Note: After 33 games, clubs in the bottom half of the table at the split cannot climb into the top half, regardless of the number of points earned during matches 34–38.)	
8	Ballymena United	38	11	13	14	54	68	−14	46	
9	Glenavon	38	12	6	20	64	62	+2	42	
10	Dungannon Swifts	38	9	13	16	42	58	−16	40	
11	Donegal Celtic (R)	38	6	9	23	32	80	−48	27	Qualification to Promotion/relegation play-off
12	Lisburn Distillery (R)	38	4	7	27	29	90	−61	19	Relegation to NIFL Championship 1

Source: rsssf.com
Rules for classification: 1st points; 2nd goal difference; 3rd number of goals scored; 4th head-to-head points; 5th head-to-head goal difference
(C) Champions; (R) Relegated

== Results ==
=== Matches 1–22 ===
During matches 1–22 each team played every other team twice (home and away).

Home \ Away	BMD	BYM	CLI	COL	CRU	DGC	DUN	GLA	GLT	LIN	LIS	POR
Ballinamallard United		0–0	1–3	1–0	0–2	0–0	2–2	2–1	1–4	1–3	2–0	2–0
Ballymena United	1–1		0–8	0–2	2–1	3–3	1–1	2–1	1–1	2–0	2–0	1–2
Cliftonville	0–1	2–1		3–1	1–0	3–1	4–1	2–1	1–1	3–0	4–0	3–2
Coleraine	1–5	4–1	1–5		3–1	2–1	2–0	0–2	1–0	3–2	2–1	1–1
Crusaders	2–1	0–0	3–1	1–1		2–0	2–1	5–1	2–0	2–2	3–1	2–0
Donegal Celtic	0–3	1–0	0–1	1–3	2–5		1–1	1–1	2–1	0–3	0–3	1–1
Dungannon Swifts	0–1	1–3	1–1	1–1	2–0	3–0		2–1	1–3	1–1	1–1	1–1
Glenavon	0–1	4–1	0–2	1–1	1–0	4–2	0–1		1–1	2–3	4–1	2–2
Glentoran	2–1	1–2	1–1	0–0	1–1	3–1	2–1	2–1		1–1	3–0	0–1
Linfield	1–3	2–1	1–2	0–0	1–2	4–0	2–1	1–1	2–1		4–0	1–0
Lisburn Distillery	0–5	0–4	1–2	1–1	1–3	3–3	2–1	0–1	0–2	1–1		0–5
Portadown	2–1	2–2	3–3	3–4	1–0	1–0	1–1	2–0	2–4	2–4	4–2	

Source: rsssf.com
Legend: Blue = home team win; Yellow = draw; Red = away team win.

=== Matches 23–33 ===
During matches 23–33 each team played every other team for the third time (either at home, or away).

Home \ Away	BMD	BYM	CLI	COL	CRU	DGC	DUN	GLA	GLT	LIN	LIS	POR
Ballinamallard United			0–1		1–3		4–0	3–1		0–0		0–1
Ballymena United	3–0			0–1		2–2			0–0		3–3	
Cliftonville		5–0		5–0		2–1	2–0		4–1		4–0	
Coleraine	0–0				1–3	0–0			1–1		3–1	
Crusaders		5–1	3–0				1–1			3–0		1–0
Donegal Celtic	1–0				0–3			1–0		1–4	0–3 (Note: Original 2–1 result overturned to 0–3 after Donegal Celtic fielded an ineligible player.)	
Dungannon Swifts		0–0		1–3		0–0				1–4	1–0	2–0
Glenavon		7–0	1–3	1–1	2–3		3–1			0–3		
Glentoran	3–0				4–5	5–0	2–3	2–1		1–1		
Linfield		2–2	3–1	5–2							1–1	2–0
Lisburn Distillery	0–2				0–2			2–1	0–3			1–1
Portadown		0–0	1–3	2–0		1–0		3–1	0–1			

Source: rsssf.com
Legend: Blue = home team win; Yellow = draw; Red = away team win.

=== Matches 34–38 ===
During matches 34–38 each team played every other team in their half of the table once. As this was the fourth time that teams played each other this season, home sides in this round were chosen so that they played each other twice at home and twice away.

==== Section A ====
Home \ Away	BMD	CLI	COL	CRU	GLT	LIN
Ballinamallard United			1–1		0–0	
Cliftonville	2–1			3–1		3–2
Coleraine		0–2				1–1
Crusaders	3–1		2–1		3–2	
Glentoran		3–0	1–1			
Linfield	0–1			1–2	1–0	

Source: rsssf.com
Legend: Blue = home team win; Yellow = draw; Red = away team win.

==== Section B ====
Home \ Away	BYM	DGC	DUN	GLA	LIS	POR
Ballymena United			1–2	0–2		6–1
Donegal Celtic	1–4		2–1			1–2
Dungannon Swifts				2–3		
Glenavon		3–1			7–0	1–3
Lisburn Distillery	0–2	0–1	0–1			
Portadown			1–1		1–0	

Source: rsssf.com
Legend: Blue = home team win; Yellow = draw; Red = away team win.

== Promotion/relegation play-off ==
Donegal Celtic played Warrenpoint Town, the runners-up of the 2012–13 IFA Championship 1 in a two-legged tie for a place in next season's NIFL Premiership. Warrenpoint Town won the tie on the away goals rule to reach the top flight for the first time in the club's history. Donegal Celtic were relegated to next season's Championship 1.

7 May 2013
19:15 BST

Warrenpoint Town	1 – 0	Donegal Celtic
Hughes 77'	Report

Milltown, Warrenpoint

10 May 2013
19:45 BST

Donegal Celtic	2 – 1	Warrenpoint Town
McVeigh 45'; Miskimmin 83'	Report	McCabe 74'

Donegal Celtic Park, Belfast

2–2 on aggregate. Warrenpoint Town won on away goals rule and were promoted. Donegal Celtic were relegated.

== Top scorers ==
Rank	Scorer	Club	Goals
1	(Northern Ireland) Liam Boyce	Cliftonville	29
2	(Northern Ireland) Andrew Waterworth	Glentoran	20
3	(Northern Ireland) Darren Murray	Portadown	18
4	(Northern Ireland) Curtis Allen	Coleraine	17
4	(Northern Ireland) Joe Gormley	Cliftonville	17
6	(Northern Ireland) Jordan Owens	Crusaders	16
7	(Northern Ireland) Timmy Adamson	Crusaders	15
8	(Scotland) Gary McCutcheon	Crusaders	13
9	(Northern Ireland) David Cushley	Ballymena United	11
9	(Northern Ireland) Brian McCaul	Linfield	11
