= 2019–20 NIFL Premier Intermediate League =

NIFL Premier Intermediate League
- Season: 2019–20
- Dates: 31 Aug 2019 – 7 Mar 2020
- Champions: Annagh United
- Promoted: Annagh United
- Matches played: 70
- Goals scored: 237 (3.39 per match)

Locations of the 2019–20 NIFL Premier Intermediate teams

The 2019–20 NIFL Premier Intermediate League was the fourth season of the NIFL Premier Intermediate League, the third tier of the Northern Ireland Football League - the national football league in Northern Ireland.

The season began on 31 August 2019 and was originally scheduled to conclude in April 2020, However, the season was suspended on 13 March 2020 as a result of the worldwide COVID-19 pandemic. No further fixtures were played, with the final games held on 7 March 2020 and the season being officially curtailed in June 2020. Annagh United were therefore declared as champions.

== League table ==
Pos	Team	Pld	W	D	L	GF	GA	GD	Pts	Promotion or relegation
1	Annagh United (C)	14	10	3	1	32	14	+18	33	Promotion to NIFL Championship
2	Portstewart	14	8	6	0	28	13	+15	30	
3	Dollingstown	13	8	1	4	31	15	+16	25	
4	Bangor	12	6	2	4	30	21	+9	20	
5	Newington	11	5	3	3	16	18	−2	18	
6	Armagh City	14	3	5	6	15	26	−11	14	
7	Banbridge Town	12	3	4	5	16	20	−4	13	
8	Lisburn Distillery	13	3	4	6	13	25	−12	13	
9	Moyola Park	12	3	1	8	21	28	−7	10	
10	Limavady United	13	2	3	8	21	32	−11	9	
11	Tobermore United	12	2	2	8	14	25	−11	8	

Rules for classification: 1st points; 2nd goal difference; 3rd goals scored; 4th head-to-head points; 5th head-to-head goal difference
(C) Champions
