= 2011–12 IFA Premiership =

IFA Premiership
- Season: 2011–12
- Champions: Linfield; 3rd Premiership title 51st Irish title
- Relegated: Carrick Rangers
- Champions League: Linfield
- Europa League: Portadown; Cliftonville; Crusaders (via Irish Cup)
- Matches: 228
- Top goalscorer: Gary McCutcheon (27 goals)
- Biggest home win: Linfield 5–0 Donegal Celtic; Glentoran 6–1 Carrick Rangers; Linfield 5–0 Crusaders
- Biggest away win: Lisburn Distillery 0–5 Glentoran; Dungannon Swifts 0–5 Glentoran
- Highest scoring: Ballymena Utd 3–7 Cliftonville
- Highest attendance: 5,300 Glentoran 1-0 Linfield (Monday 26 December 2011)
- Lowest attendance: 94 Donegal Celtic 3-1 Dungannon Swifts (Tuesday 20 March 2012)

The 2011–12 IFA Premiership (known as the Carling Premiership for sponsorship reasons) was the 4th season of the IFA Premiership, the highest level of league football in Northern Ireland, and the 111th season of Irish league football overall.

Linfield were champions, winning the league for the 51st time and the 3rd consecutive season.

== Summary ==
The season began on 6 August 2011, and ended on 28 April 2012. Linfield were the defending champions, after winning their 50th title last season. They successfully defended their title, to win the league for the sixth time in seven seasons after a 2–1 home win over Portadown on 7 April 2012.

Carrick Rangers were relegated to Championship 1 after only one season in the top flight. Dungannon Swifts' 2–1 win over Donegal Celtic on 21 April 2012 left them bottom of the table by four points, with only one game remaining. Lisburn Distillery retained their Premiership status by defeating Newry City 3–2 over two legs in the promotion/relegation play-off.

== Teams ==
2010–11 IFA Championship 1 winners Carrick Rangers were promoted to this season's Premiership, with last season's bottom-placed Premiership club Newry City replacing them in Championship 1.

Championship 1 runners-up Limavady United were not eligible to take part in a promotion/relegation play-off against last season's 11th-placed Premiership club Donegal Celtic, as they did not attain the required domestic licence.

=== Stadia and locations ===
Location of teams in the 2011–12 IFA Premiership
Location of the Belfast-based teams in the 2011–12 IFA Premiership

Club	Stadium	Location	Capacity
Ballymena United	The Showgrounds	Ballymena	1,418 (all seated)
Carrick Rangers	Seaview	Belfast	1,977 (663 seats)^{1}
Cliftonville	Solitude	Belfast	2,180 (1,878 seats)
Coleraine	The Showgrounds	Coleraine	2,496 (1,106 seats)
Crusaders	Seaview	Belfast	1,977 (663 seats)
Donegal Celtic	Donegal Celtic Park	Belfast	2,254 (988 seats)
Dungannon Swifts	Stangmore Park	Dungannon	5,000 (600 seats)
Glenavon	Mourneview Park	Lurgan	5,000 (4,000 seats)
Glentoran	The Oval	Belfast	5,056 (3,991 seats)
Linfield	Windsor Park	Belfast	12,342 (all seated)
Lisburn Distillery	New Grosvenor Stadium	Lisburn	7,000 (540 seats)
Portadown	Shamrock Park	Portadown	2,227 (all seated)

^{1} Carrick Rangers played their home matches at Crusaders' Seaview ground.

== League table ==
Pos	Team	Pld	W	D	L	GF	GA	GD	Pts	Qualification or relegation
1	Linfield (C)	38	27	4	7	79	29	+50	85	Qualification to Champions League first qualifying round
2	Portadown	38	22	5	11	72	47	+25	71	Qualification to Europa League first qualifying round
3	Cliftonville	38	21	6	11	83	62	+21	69	Qualification to Europa League first qualifying round
4	Coleraine	38	18	12	8	61	38	+23	66	
5	Crusaders	38	18	10	10	63	47	+16	64	Qualification to Europa League first qualifying round (Note: 2011–12 Irish Cup runners-up Crusaders qualified for the first qualifying round of the UEFA Europa League, as cup winners Linfield had already qualified for the UEFA Champions League.)
6	Glentoran	38	16	9	13	67	52	+15	57	
7	Ballymena United	38	14	8	16	66	71	−5	50	
8	Donegal Celtic	38	12	5	21	44	80	−36	41	
9	Dungannon Swifts	38	8	11	19	42	71	−29	35	
10	Glenavon	38	8	10	20	60	71	−11	34	
11	Lisburn Distillery (O)	38	8	8	22	56	84	−28	32	Qualification to Promotion/relegation play-off
12	Carrick Rangers (R)	38	7	10	21	50	91	−41	31	Relegation to IFA Championship 1

Source: rsssf.com
Rules for classification: 1st points; 2nd goal difference; 3rd number of goals scored; 4th head-to-head points; 5th head-to-head goal difference
(C) Champions; (O) Play-off winners; (R) Relegated

== Results ==
=== Matches 1–22 ===
During matches 1–22 each team played every other team twice (home and away).

Home \ Away	BYM	CRK	CLI	COL	CRU	DGC	DUN	GLA	GLT	LIN	LIS	POR
Ballymena United		0–2	3–7	1–5	0–3	2–0	1–1	3–3	0–3	1–2	1–0	2–4
Carrick Rangers	0–2		3–3	0–2	1–2	1–2	1–1	2–2	3–3	0–4	0–0	2–2
Cliftonville	3–4	1–0		1–2	2–1	2–3	4–1	5–3	2–1	4–2	3–1	0–2
Coleraine	1–0	4–0	1–1		0–0	2–0	3–2	1–1	1–1	1–3	2–3	4–3
Crusaders	3–2	5–1	2–2	1–1		1–2	2–0	2–0	1–2	0–1	1–1	0–3
Donegal Celtic	2–3	1–2	1–3	0–1	0–2		0–2	2–1	0–4	1–5	2–2	1–0
Dungannon Swifts	1–1	3–1	1–4	0–0	0–2	2–2		1–1	0–5	1–4	0–2	0–3
Glenavon	3–0	1–2	1–2	1–0	3–2	0–1	1–1		1–3	1–2	5–2	0–2
Glentoran	2–4	6–1	0–1	1–1	2–2	1–2	2–1	2–0		2–0	3–3	0–2
Linfield	1–0	3–0	4–1	1–0	2–0	5–0	1–0	1–0	0–1		1–1	2–0
Lisburn Distillery	1–4	2–3	1–2	1–3	1–2	0–2	1–2	2–1	0–5	2–3		0–2
Portadown	2–1	3–0	1–2	1–1	1–3	5–2	2–1	1–0	2–1	2–0	5–1	

Source: rsssf.com
Legend: Blue = home team win; Yellow = draw; Red = away team win.

=== Matches 23–33 ===
During matches 23–33 each team played other team for the third time (either at home, or away).

Home \ Away	BYM	CRK	CLI	COL	CRU	DGC	DUN	GLA	GLT	LIN	LIS	POR
Ballymena United			0–1			2–2	1–1			1–2	2–2	1–2
Carrick Rangers	1–3			0–4		2–3	0–0		2–2			3–1
Cliftonville		2–1		1–1			2–1	4–3		1–3		
Coleraine	2–0				1–0	0–1		3–1		1–0		
Crusaders	2–2	3–1	3–2					1–0	2–0		2–2	
Donegal Celtic			0–2		1–1		3–1	1–1	0–1		2–1	
Dungannon Swifts				1–2	1–2			1–5	2–1			2–0
Glenavon	0–2	3–2							1–0		2–3	0–2
Glentoran	1–2		1–0	3–3						1–0	1–3	2–2
Linfield		4–1			5–0	4–0	3–0	2–0				
Lisburn Distillery		3–1	1–3	3–1			0–2			0–3		0–2
Portadown			3–3	2–0	1–2	2–1				1–1		

Source: rsssf.com
Legend: Blue = home team win; Yellow = draw; Red = away team win.

=== Matches 34–38 ===
During matches 34–38 each team played every other team in their half of the table once. As this was the fourth time that teams had played each other this season, home sides in this round were chosen so that teams played each other twice at home and twice away.

==== Section A ====
Home \ Away	CLI	COL	CRU	GLT	LIN	POR
Cliftonville			1–1	3–0		2–3
Coleraine	1–0			1–1		4–1
Crusaders		2–1			1–1	0–1
Glentoran			0–4			
Linfield	2–1	0–0		0–2		2–1
Portadown				0–1		

Source: rsssf.com
Legend: Blue = home team win; Yellow = draw; Red = away team win.

==== Section B ====
Home \ Away	BYM	CRK	DGC	DUN	GLA	LIS
Ballymena United		3–0			2–2	
Carrick Rangers					4–4	2–1
Donegal Celtic	0–3	3–5				
Dungannon Swifts	2–4	0–0	2–1			3–2
Glenavon			4–0	2–2		
Lisburn Distillery	2–3		3–0		3–3	

Source: rsssf.com
Legend: Blue = home team win; Yellow = draw; Red = away team win.

== Promotion/relegation play-off ==
Lisburn Distillery, the club that finished in the relegation play-off place, faced Newry City, the runners-up of the 2011–12 IFA Championship in a two-legged tie for a place in next season's IFA Premiership.

Lisburn Distillery won the tie 3–2 on aggregate and retained their Premiership status.

1 May 2012
19:45 BST

Lisburn Distillery	0 – 0	Newry City
	Report

New Grosvenor Stadium, Ballyskeagh

4 May 2012
19:45 BST

Newry City	2 – 3	Lisburn Distillery
Tierney 33'; Hughes 37'	Report	Cushley 19'; Thompson 45'; Liggett 79'

The Showgrounds, Newry

Lisburn Distillery won 3–2 on aggregate and remained in the IFA Premiership

== Top goalscorers ==
Rank	Scorer	Club	Goals
1	(Scotland) Gary McCutcheon	Ballymena United	27
2	(Wales) Matthew Tipton	Portadown	24
3	(Northern Ireland) Gary Liggett	Lisburn Distillery	22
4	(Northern Ireland) Curtis Allen	Coleraine	20
5	(Northern Ireland) Kevin Braniff	Portadown	17
5	(Northern Ireland) Chris Scannell	Cliftonville	17
7	(Northern Ireland) Rory Donnelly	Cliftonville	13
8	(Northern Ireland) Darren Murray	Donegal Celtic	12
8	(Northern Ireland) David Rainey	Crusaders	12
10	(Northern Ireland) Mark McAllister	Linfield	11
