= Lisanally Rangers F.C. =

Lisanally Rangers
- Full name: Lisanally Rangers Football Club
- Founded: 1978
- Dissolved: 2014
- Ground: Kinston Memorial Playing Fields

Lisanally Rangers was an intermediate-level football club, based in Armagh and playing in the Mid-Ulster Football League in Northern Ireland. Club colours were white and black. The club withdrew from all competitions in July 2014.
