= Iveagh United F.C. =

Association football club in Northern Ireland

Iveagh United
- Full name: Iveagh United Football Club
- Founded: 1965
- Ground: Brook Activity Centre, Belfast
- League: NAFL Division 1C
- 2017–18: NAFL Division 1C, 13th

Iveagh United Football Club (/ˈaɪveɪ/ EYE-vay) is a Northern Irish intermediate football club based in Dunmurry, Belfast, playing in Division 1C of the Northern Amateur Football League. The club, founded in 1965 as Peter Pan, and originally based in west Belfast, has been a member of the Amateur League since 1965. Club colours are white, green and black.

The club participates in the Irish Cup.
