= Chimney Corner F.C. =

Association football club in Northern Ireland

Chimney Corner
- Full name: Chimney Corner Football Club
- Founded: 1952
- Ground: Allen Park, Antrim
- Capacity: 1,000 (106 seated)
- Manager: Bradley Close
- League: Ballymena & Provincial Football League
Home colours	Away colours

Chimney Corner is a Northern Irish, intermediate football club playing in the Ballymena & Provincial Intermediate League. The club, founded in 1952, hails from Antrim and plays its home matches at Allen Park. Club colours are red and white. The current manager is Bradley Close. They have a large youth set-up which was founded for the 2005–06 season.

The club joined the Northern Amateur Football League in 1953 and became one of its leading clubs before being elevated to the Irish League B Division in 1975. The club stayed at this level until failing to gain a place in the reorganised and re-branded IFA Championship in 2008. The 2008–09 season was spent in the IFA Interim Intermediate League, but the club gained admission to the Championship in 2009, when it was split into two divisions (Corner entering Championship 2). The club remained at this level until 2014, when they resigned to join the Ballymena & Provincial League.

In recent years the club has struggled in the third tier of Northern Irish football, finishing bottom of Championship 2 in 2009–10, 2010–11, 2011–12 and 2012–13. They were saved from relegation in those seasons by the folding of Newry City, a High Court ruling, and Irish Football Association rules governing the relegation of a club from Championship 2, when no lower regional league champions apply for membership of the Championship. In the 2012–13 season, relegation was avoided when Newry City folded after the season began, leaving the league system a club short. In the 2011–12 season, none of the four regional league champions applied for Championship entry, so Corner were spared relegation.

They were also saved from relegation in the 2010–11 season when Dollingstown, playing in the Mid-Ulster Football League Intermediate A division (one tier below IFA Championship 2), finished as league champions but were denied promotion to Championship 2 when they were later found to have fielded an ineligible player in eight league matches. As a result, Dollingstown were deducted all the points that they had gained in the matches the player had taken part in, demoting the club to 4th place in the final league table. The club appealed the decision and took their case all the way to the High Court, but it was dismissed. Tandragee Rovers were crowned champions of the division instead, but did not apply for entry to Championship 2. If Dollingstown had won their case they would have been promoted to Championship 2, with Corner being relegated.

Before the 2014–15 season, however, the club resigned from the Championship and accepted a place in the Ballymena & Provincial Intermediate League.

== Intermediate honours ==
- Irish League B Division: 2
  - 1984–85, 1998–99
- Irish Intermediate Cup: 4
  - 1967–68, 1981–82, 1982–83, 1996–97
- Steel & Sons Cup: 4
  - 1962–63, 1973–74, 1975–76, 1996–97
- B Division Knock-out Cup: 1
  - 1986–87
- Northern Amateur Football League: 5
  - 1961–62, 1968–69, 1969–70, 1973–74, 1974–75
- Clarence Cup: 2
  - 1955–56, 1969–70
- Border Cup: 7
  - 1958-59, 1967–68, 1969–70, 1970–71, 1971–72, 1973–74, 1974–75
