= Ballinamallard United F.C. =

Association football club in Northern Ireland

Ballinamallard United
- Full name: Ballinamallard United Football Club
- Nicknames: The Mallards, The Ducks
- Founded: 1975; 51 years ago
- Ground: Ferney Park
- Capacity: 2,000 (250 seated)
- Chairman: Tom Elliott
- Manager: Mark Stafford
- League: NIFL Championship
- 2025–26: NIFL Championship, 10th of 12
- Website: ballinamallardfc.co.uk
Home colours	Away colours

Ballinamallard United Football Club is a semi-professional Northern Irish football club playing in the NIFL Championship. The club, re-formed in 1975 after being dormant since the 1960s, hails from Ballinamallard, near Enniskillen, County Fermanagh, and plays its home matches at Ferney Park. Club colours are all royal blue (home), and all white (away).

== History ==
During 2008–09 and the first part of 2009–10, the club played at Holm Park, the home of Armagh City, while Ferney Park was brought up to Championship standard. The club's first match back at its own ground was on 5 December 2009 in its first ever major cup quarter final against Portadown in the League Cup.

In February 2011 the club reached its first ever Irish Cup quarter final when it defeated Lisburn Distillery 4–2 after a 6th Round replay at Ferney Park.

On 31 March 2012, the club secured promotion to the top flight of Northern Irish football for the first time in their history. A 3–2 win over Bangor secured the 2011–12 IFA Championship 1 title, and promotion to the 2012–13 IFA Premiership. They became the first team from County Fermanagh to play senior football.

In their first season in the Premiership the target was to avoid relegation. However, they surpassed all expectations, finishing 5th in the table. They secured a 2–2 draw at Ferney Park in their opening Premiership fixture against Dungannon Swifts, and their stand out results during the season included a 1–0 away win over eventual league champions Cliftonville at Solitude in September 2012. They also defeated reigning champions Linfield twice at Windsor Park, 3–1 in October 2012 and 1–0 in the post-split match in April 2013.

In their second season 2013–14 they finished in 10th place, three points above Warrenpoint Town in the play-off place after going unbeaten in their last 6 games of the season. No play-off was ultimately needed that season.

In their third season 2014–15 they finished in 9th place, 2 points above Dungannon Swifts in 10th and 9 points above Warrenpoint Town in the play-off place. The club also made history by reaching its first ever major cup semi final when it beat Glentoran in a penalty shootout in a Wasp Solutions League Cup quarter final at Ferney Park.

In the 2015–16 season the Mallard's recorded their first ever win at The Oval beating Glentoran 0–2 and they also recorded their first ever win at Shamrock Park and The Ballymena Showgrounds winning 3–0 and 2–1 respectively. The Mallard's Irish Cup campaign was a disappointing one going out in the 5th Round on penalties to Coleraine after surrendering a two-goal lead in the second half. They reached the Quarter-Finals of the League Cup before being knocked out by eventual finalists Ards in another penalty shoot out. The Mallard's contested a thrilling end to the season with Carrick Rangers and Warrenpoint Town with Ballinamallard beating Carrick 1–0 on the final day and Warrenpoint beating Dungannon Swifts 1–0 meaning Carrick would automatically return to NIFL Championship 1 and Warrenpoint Town would contest the promotion/relegation play-off and the Fermanagh side would be safe.

However, in the 89th minute at Taylor's Avenue Carrick Rangers equalized through Mark Surgenor meaning that Carrick would still be automatically relegated to the NIFL Championship 1 but that Ballinamallard would now contest the play-off and Warrenpoint Town would be safe in 10th place. The drama took yet another turn when in the 94th minute of the game at Taylor's Avenue in the final minute of stoppage time, Miguel Chines scored a stunning bicycle kick to win the game for Carrick Rangers meaning in fact that they would be safe prompting wild celebrations from the Carrick supporters meaning now that Ballinamallard would be automatically relegated to Championship 1 and Warrenpoint would contest the play-off. In the final turn, Warrenpoint Town conceded a controversial penalty in the dying seconds of their game with Andrew Mitchell putting it away to make it 1–1 now automatically relegating Warrenpoint Town and Ballinamallard United contesting the play-off with Institute where they managed to beat the Drumahoe side 2–1 away from home and drew 3–3 at Ferney Park to secure the club's premier league status for the 2016–17 season. On 13 May 2016 it was announced legendary manager, Whitey Anderson, would be leaving the club after over ten years service. Finn Harps assistant coach Gavin Dykes was appointed as his replacement. The Mallards went on to secure 10th place to guarantee their 6th season in the NIFL Premiership.

On 30 March 2019 Ballinamallard United reached their first ever Irish Cup final by beating Warrenpoint Town in a penalty shoot-out. Striker Ryan Campbell scored the winning penalty. In the final on 4 May, they lost 3–0 to Crusaders.

In November 2023, the club appointed former Dergview boss Tommy Canning following the departure of Harry McConkey, who had managed the club since March 2018. Canning would depart the club at the end of the season, citing work commitments and travel for the reason behind his resignation. Mark Stafford, having served under Canning as assistant manager, was named as his successor.

== Current squad ==
Note: Flags indicate national team as defined under FIFA eligibility rules; some limited exceptions apply. Players may hold more than one non-FIFA nationality.

No.	Pos.	Nation	Player
2	DF	NIR	Ryan Morris
3	DF	NIR	Dean Corrigan
4	DF	NIR	Richard Johnston
5	MF	IRL	David Jonathan (on loan from Sligo Rovers)
6	DF	NIR	Alex Holder
7	DF	NIR	Aaron Arkinson
9	FW	NIR	Oisin Gormley
10	FW	NIR	Joshua McIlwaine
11	MF	IRL	Gary Armstrong
12	GK	NIR	Jamie Ray

No.	Pos.	Nation	Player
14	MF	NIR	Darragh Byrne
17	FW	IRL	Callum Moorhead
18	DF	NIR	Tiarnan Campbell
19	FW	IRL	Marc Walsh
20	MF	NIR	James McGrath
21	FW	NIR	Tommy Connolly (On loan from Dungannon Swifts u23s)
23	FW	NIR	Jamie Dunne
24	DF	NIR	Nathan Sherry
25	FW	NIR	Daniel Barker
33	GK	NIR	Lorcan Donnelly (on loan from Glentoran)

== Honours ==
=== Senior honours ===
- North West Senior Cup : 2
  - 2019–20, 2022–23

=== Intermediate honours ===
- Irish League Second Division/IFA Championship 1 : 2
  - 2002–03, 2011–12
- IFA Reserve League : 1
  - 2012–13†
- Irish Intermediate Cup: 1
  - 1994–95
- Fermanagh & Western Intermediate Cup: 1
  - 2010–11
- Fermanagh & Western League Championship: 4
  - 1925–26, 1957–58, 1997–98, 2001–02
- Fermanagh & Western Mulhern Cup: 3
  - 1954–55, 1988–89, 2010–11
- Fermanagh & Western Reihill Cup: 4
  - 1986–87, 1987–88, 1988–89, 1995–96

† Won by Ballinamallard United II (reserve team)

=== Youth honours ===
- Harry Cavan Irish Youth Cup: 3
  - 2001–02, 2005–06, 2022–23
- IFA Youth League Cup: 1
  - 2011–12
