= Ballyclare Comrades F.C. =

Association football club in Northern Ireland

Ballyclare Comrades
- Full name: Ballyclare Comrades Football Club
- Founded: February 1919
- Ground: Dixon Park, Ballyclare, County Antrim
- Capacity: 2,398 (538 seated)
- Chairman: Robert Fleck
- Manager: Nathan McConnell & Gary Scott
- League: NCL Premier
- 2025–26: NIFL Premier Intermediate League, 10th of 14
Home colours	Away colours

Ballyclare Comrades Football Club is an intermediate, Northern Irish football club playing in the NCL Premier. The club hails from Ballyclare, County Antrim and plays its home matches at Dixon Park. Club colours are red and white. The club's rivals are Carrick Rangers and Larne and games between the three clubs are referred to as "The East Antrim Derbies".

== History ==
The club was founded in 1919 by veterans of the First World War, most of them from "C" Company of the 12th Royal Irish Rifles – a battalion made up entirely of East Antrim men, who fought at the Battle of the Somme and in many other First World War battles. From 1990 until 2003, the club enjoyed senior status, but reverted to intermediate status when the Irish Premier League was established and the number of senior clubs was reduced.

The club's reserve team play in the NIFL Development League for under-20s. The club also has a partnership with local youth club Ballyclare Colts, whose sides (from under 11 to under 15) provide players to progress to Comrades' own youth sides at under-17 and under-18 level. The under-18 side plays in the IFA Youth League.

The club was relegated to IFA Championship 2 in the 2010–11 season and finished in 6th place in the 2011–12 season, but the following season brought promotion back to Championship 1 after finishing as runners-up behind Championship 2 winners Knockbreda. One of the club's most famous products was Northern Ireland and San Diego defender Paddy McNair, who attends games when possible. Gareth McAuley and Michael Smith both played for the Comrades before switching to professional football.

The club finished an impressive third in the 2016–17 season, losing out in a promotion playoff to Institute. The club continues with the ambition of returning to the NIFL Premiership.

== Current squad ==
Note: Flags indicate national team as defined under FIFA eligibility rules; some limited exceptions apply. Players may hold more than one non-FIFA nationality.

No.	Pos.	Nation	Player
3	DF	NIR	Lee McCune
4	DF	IRL	Paul Finnegan
5	DF	NIR	Corrie Burns
6	DF	NIR	Kyle Calderwood
8	MF	NIR	Cillin Gilmour

No.	Pos.	Nation	Player
9	FW	NIR	Brandon Doyle
10	FW	NIR	Jack Berry
14	FW	NIR	Fiontan O'Boyle
21	FW	NIR	Michael Leetch
46	DF	NIR	Theo McToal

== Honours ==
=== Senior honours ===
- Ulster Cup: 1
  - 1997–98

=== Intermediate honours ===
- Irish League B Division: 6
  - 1960–61, 1962–63, 1973–74, 1977–78, 1979–80, 1988–89
- IFA Intermediate League Second Division: 1
  - 2006–07
- Irish Intermediate Cup: 9
  - 1925–26, 1949–50, 1950–51, 1953–54, 1959–60, 1960–61, 1962–63, 1963–64, 1989–90
- B Division Knock-out Cup: 2
  - 1983–84, 1988–89
- George Wilson Cup: 4
  - 1955–56, 1960–61, 1962–63, 1993–94†
- Steel & Sons Cup: 6
  - 1943–44, 1960–61, 1974–75, 1981–82, 1984–85, 1986–87
- McElroy Cup: 1
  - 1941–42
- Clarence Cup: 3
  - 1980–81†, 1982–83†, 1983–84†

† Won by reserve team
