= Annagh United F.C. =

Association football club in Northern Ireland

Coordinates: 54°24′34.4″N 6°26′17.9″W

Annagh United
- Full name: Annagh United Football Club
- Founded: 1963
- Ground: BMG Arena, Portadown
- Capacity: 950 (150 seated)
- Chairman: Noel Walker
- Manager: Ciaran McGurgan
- League: NIFL Championship
- 2025–26: NIFL Championship, 2nd of 12
Home colours	Away colours

Annagh United Football Club, referred to as Annagh United, is a semi-professional, Northern Irish football club playing in the NIFL Championship. The club, founded in 1963, hails from Portadown and plays its home matches at the BMG Arena. The club's home colours are all red at home and all white away. Annagh United are a part of the Mid-Ulster Football Association. The club plays in the Irish Cup.

== History ==
Tandragee Road has been the club's home since 1983. When the club opened its new pitch, George Best played in an Annagh United select side.

In the 2009–10 season, however, the team finished near the bottom of the league and manager Wilkinson parted company with the club. In late July, former Loughgall caretaker manager David Johnstone was appointed manager. Johnstone played for Ards, Carrick Rangers, Larne and Loughgall. Recent seasons have brought some notable cup runs, none less than 2006–07 under the reign of Niall Currie, now boss at fellow Championship club Dundela, when they reached the Mid-Ulster Cup final against local senior club Newry City and the Irish Intermediate Cup semi-final against Coagh United. Annagh lost out to the latter in the Bob Radcliffe Cup semi-final earlier in that season.

Johnstone has since departed the club and the temporary management team of players Dean Smith, Darragh Peden and Alan Murphy took over. Dean Smith was confirmed as manager for the 2013–14 season with Alan Murphy assistant and Darragh Peden coach. The club were promoted to the NIFL Championship 1 in the 2014–15 season and managed to survive for the 2016–17 season.

The club suffered greatly in their second season in NIFL Championship 1 suffering very heavy defeats to Institute, Dergview, Knockbreda and Warrenpoint Town with the club sitting rock bottom of Championship 1. They did, however, pull off an upset in the League Cup when they defeated Glentoran 3–2 with Nacho Novo scoring his first goal for the East Belfast side in what was Alan Kernaghan's last game in charge of Glentoran.

In the 2018–19 season, the club was led by manager Ciaran McGurgan, with Simon Haffey as assistant manager and Paul Matchett, John Convery and Alan Murphy as coaches. The season started well, with the club unbeaten in the league from August 2018 to January 2019. They finished as league runners-up and competed with the PSNI from NIFL Championship in a two-legged play-off losing 5–3 on aggregate.

2019–20 season, the club started well. With 14 games played the club was top of the league on 33 points having recorded 10 wins and 3 draws but March 2020 brought the Coronavirus Pandemic, leading to all football being suspended. At the NIFL's Board meeting on Monday 22 June, the Board determined that following the conclusion of the consultation process with all member clubs via Management Committees, and the appraisal of all season-end options, the current league season would be curtailed immediately. It was also determined that the NIFL would engage an independent football data consultancy to recommend and apply a mathematical model in order to determine final standings in each division. In June 2020 Annagh United were successfully crowned NIFL Premier Intermediate League Champions and promoted to the NIFL Championship.

With no league games for NIFL Championship or PIL Premiership teams and no fans allowed into games due to the ongoing COVID-19 situation it was decided to play the Irish Cup and the team in April 2021 played away to Linfield in the Irish Cup performing valiantly well in a 2–0 defeat.

The 2021–22 season saw Annagh United finish in 2nd place in the NIFL Championship behind winners Newry City, as well as reaching the Mid-Ulster Cup final, losing to Warrenpoint Town. Annagh would go into the promotion play-off for a place in the NIFL Premiership against neighbours Portadown in what was a remarkable achievement for a club like Annagh, who had never been in this position before. The two legs would draw large crowds and resulted in Portadown winning 3–2 at the BMG Arena and 1–0 at Shamrock Park in the return leg to retain their NIFL Premiership status.

The following the season 2022/2023 the club would have another run at the play offs, this time against Dungannon Swifts, after a valliant 2–1 win at the BMG Arena, a 2–0 defeat in the 2nd leg would see Annaghs wait for a maiden promotion to Northern Irelands top flight continue.

2023/2024 Annagh United faced disastrous flooding at the end October but after reasonable start the team went on a fantastic run at the turn of the year and ended with the club finishing 4th in the NIFL Championship after narrowly missing out on a play off promotion spot that was challenged strongly by four teams.

2024/2025 A season that saw Annagh United finish 2nd in the NIFL Championship, behind winners Bangor FC, who achieved automatic promotion, resulting in yet another play-off match for Premier League status versus Carrick Rangers.

The first leg saw Carrick Rangers win 5-2 at the BMG Arena and Annagh United also suffered a 3-1 defeat in the 2nd leg at Taylors Avenue.

2025/2026 Annagh United had yet another good season and not only finished 2nd again in the NIFL Championship, but also won the Mid Ulster Cup for the first time.

On 28 January, Annagh United defeated Rathfriland Rangers 2–0 with goals from Jude Johnston and James Convie to make Niall Nenderson the first Annagh United captain to lift the Mid-Ulster Cup in the club's history.

Having finished 2nd place in the league, 2026 saw Annagh United enter again into the 4th Premier league Play-off in recent seasons this time against Crusaders FC.

The first leg at the BMG Arena on Tuesday 28 April saw Crusaders win 3-2 and Annagh United defeeated Crusaders 2-1 at Seaview on Friday 1st May bringing the contaest to penalty kicks to decide which team would be playing in the Premier league for the 2026/2027 season. Crusaders won the spot kicks 3-1 maintaining Premiership status.

== Honours ==
=== Senior honours ===
- Mid-Ulster Cup 1
  - 2025-26

=== Intermediate honours ===
- NIFL Premier Intermediate League 1
  - 2019–20

== Current squad ==
Note: Flags indicate national team as defined under FIFA eligibility rules; some limited exceptions apply. Players may hold more than one non-FIFA nationality.

No.	Pos.	Nation	Player
1	GK	NIR	Joel Little
2	DF	NIR	Nathan Kerr
3	DF	NIR	Kris Calvert
4	MF	NIR	Conal Young
5	DF	NIR	Odhran Skelton
6	MF	NIR	Jack Henderson
8	MF	NIR	Niall Henderson
9	FW	DOM	Alberto Baldé
10	FW	NIR	James Convie
11	FW	NIR	Craig Taylor
17	DF	NIR	Aaron Rogers

No.	Pos.	Nation	Player
18	DF	NIR	Lee Upton
19	FW	IRL	Tobi Jinadu
20	FW	NIR	Jack Evans
21	GK	NIR	Martin Marron
23	DF	NIR	Ross Redman
27	FW	NIR	Eoin Teggart
77	MF	IRL	Philip Donnelly
-	MF	NIR	Ruairi McDonald
-	FW	NIR	Rhys Calvert
-	FW	CAN	Henry Cromack
-	FW	NIR	Ryan McNickle
