= Coagh United F.C. =

Association football club in Northern Ireland

Coagh United
- Full name: Coagh United Football Club
- Founded: 1970
- Ground: Hagan Park
- Capacity: 2,000
- Coordinates: 54.6475°N 6.6149°W
- League: NCL Premier
- 2025–26: NIFL Premier Intermediate League, 12th of 14
Home colours

Coagh United Football Club is an intermediate, Northern Irish football club playing in the NCL Premier. The club, founded in 1970, hails from Coagh, near Cookstown, County Tyrone. They play their home games at Hagan Park.

== History ==
The club, which was founded in 1970, won the Bob Radcliffe Cup in the 1988–89 season. It won the Border Cup in 1995–96.

In the 2003–04 season, Coagh United won the third-tier championship of Northern Irish football, the NIFL Premier Intermediate League. They were crowned champions of the third-tier for a second time in the 2011–12 season, after a title race with Dundela and Knockbreda F.C.

In 2016, the club was relegated from the Northern Ireland Football League.

The club made their return for the 2023/24 season following a play-off win against Mid-Ulster Football League champions Oxford Sunnyside. A last minute goal sparked celebrations amongst players and supporters.

The club was the first club of Leeds United and Northern Ireland player Stuart Dallas. He played for Coagh United between 2007 and 2010, when he left to join Premiership side Crusaders.

In the 2022–23 season, Coagh United were the champions of the Ballymena & Provincial Football League. This entered them into a play-off for promotion to the Premier Intermediate with Oxford Sunnyside and Rathfriland Rangers, who had won the Mid-Ulster League and NAFL Premier Division respectively. In the end, Rathfriland and Coagh earned promotion to the NIFL Premier Intermediate League. Upon their return to the third tier of Northern Irish football, Coagh ended the season in 7th place.

== Ground ==
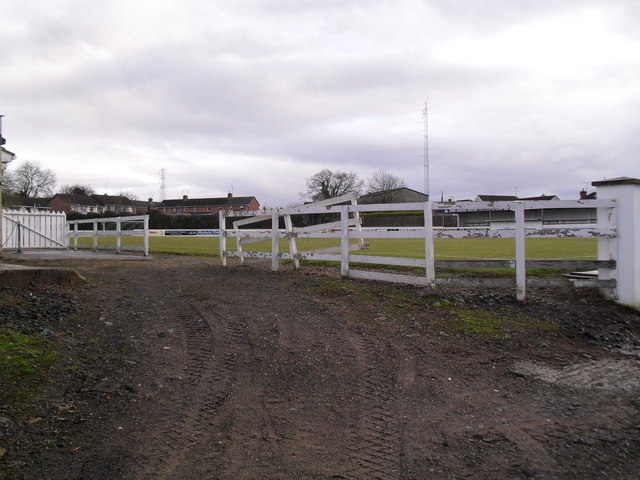
Hagan Park

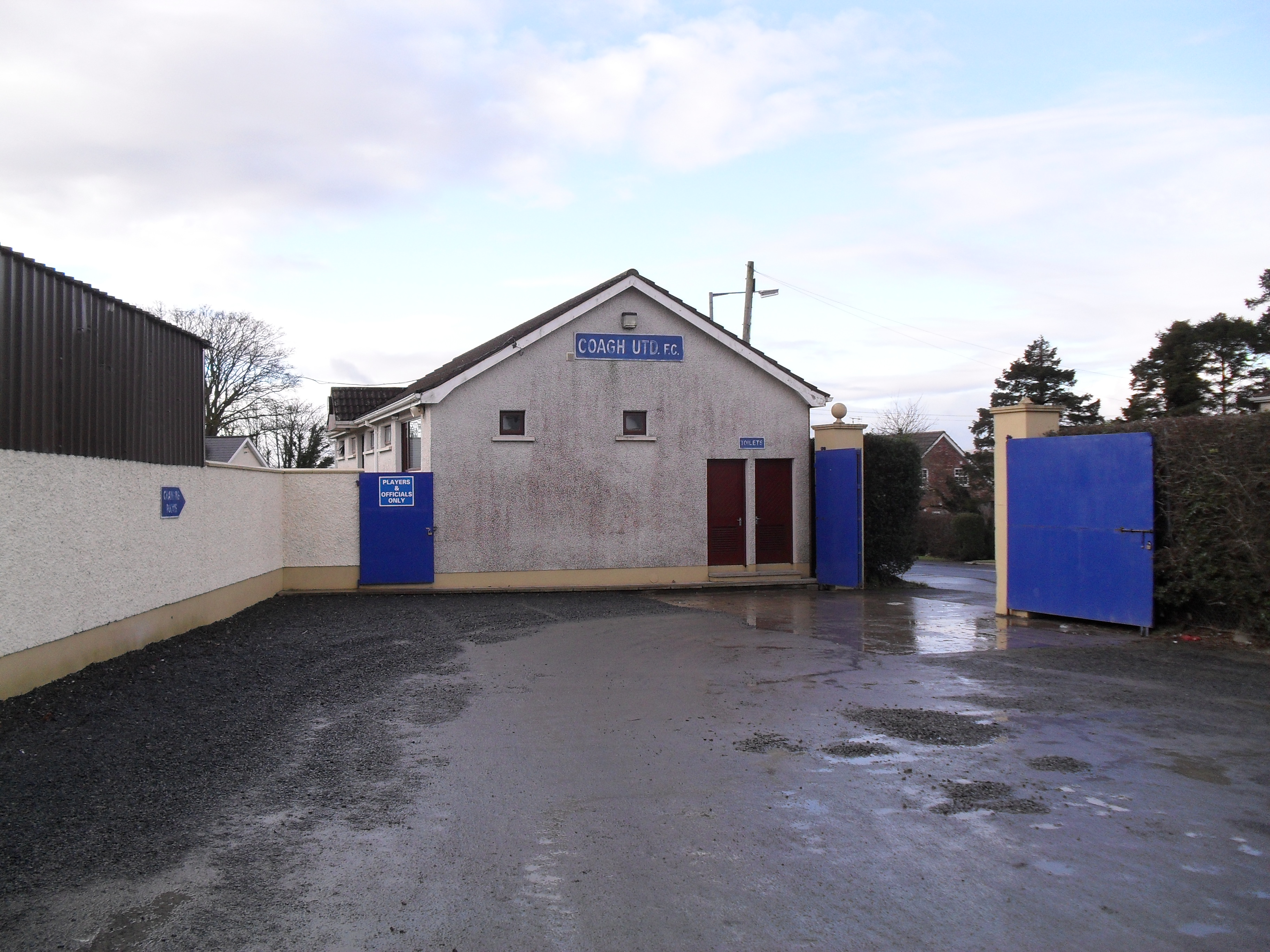
Gate and building at Hagan Park

The club plays their home games at Hagan Park. This ground, on the Ballinderry Road in Coagh, has a capacity of approximately 2,000.

== Honours ==
=== Intermediate honours ===
- IFA Intermediate League Second Division/IFA Championship 2: 2
  - 2003–04, 2011–12
- Bob Radcliffe Cup: 2
  - 1988–89, 2006–07
- Border Cup: 1
  - 1995–96
- Ballymena & Provincial Football League: 2
  - 2016–17, 2022–23
- McReynolds Cup: 2
  - 2021–22; 2022–23
