= Belfast Celtic F.C. (1978) =

Northern Irish football club

Belfast Celtic
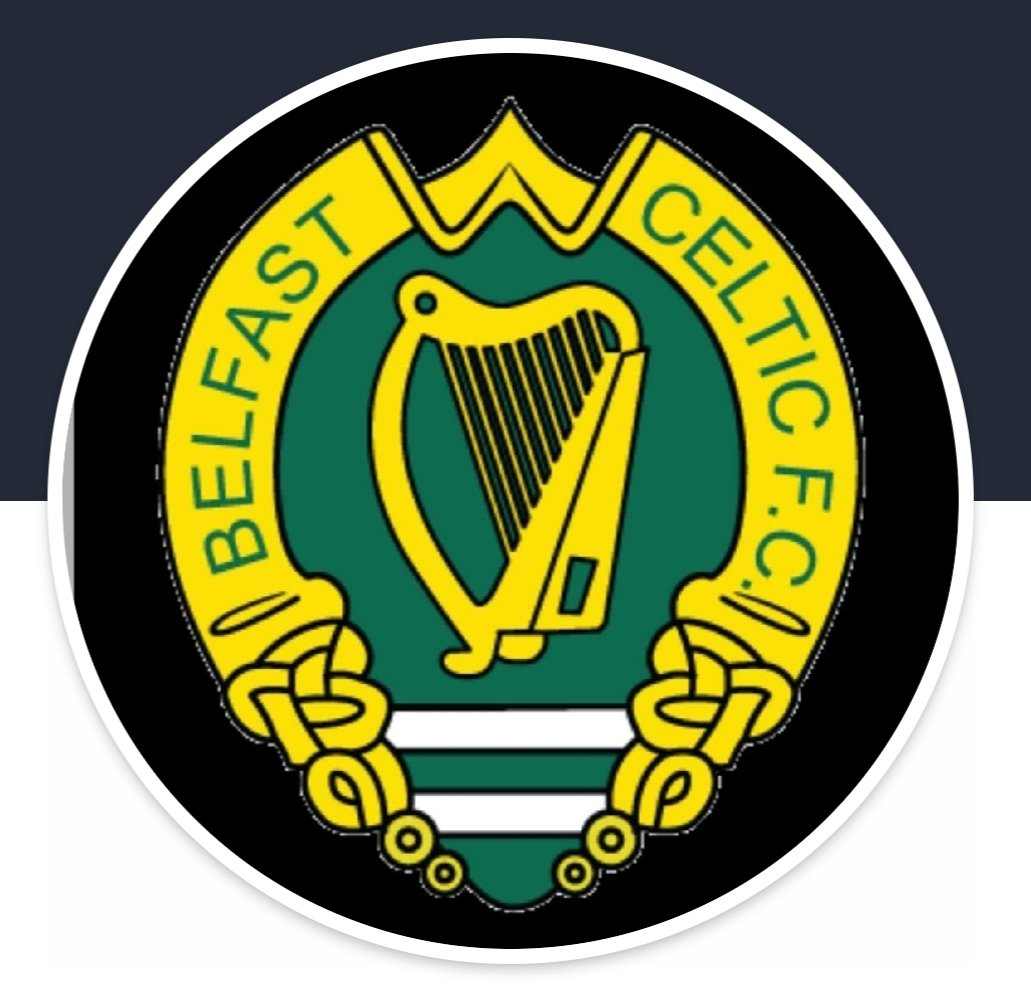
- Full name: Belfast Celtic Football Club CIC.
- Nickname(s): The "Dark Hoops"
- Founded: 1978 (as Sport and Leisure Swifts); 2019 (as Belfast Celtic)
- Ground: Glen Road Heights, Belfast
- Chairman: Gerry Kelly(interim)
- Manager: Conor Downey
- League: Ballymena & Provincial Intermediate League
Home colours

Belfast Celtic Football Club is an intermediate, Northern Irish football club playing in the Ballymena & Provincial Intermediate League. The club hails from Belfast and plays its home games at Páirc Na gCeiltigh (Glen Road Heights), which is in the west of the city. It was founded as Sport & Leisure Swifts in 1978, although the club views its rebranding in 2019 as the beginning of a new club, when it was rebranded as Belfast Celtic.

The club played in the County Down Premier League and the Dunmurry League, before joining the Northern Amateur League in 1990. The club joined the IFA Championship (later the NIFL Premier Intermediate League) in 2009. It shared Larne's Inver Park ground while its own home at Glen Road was improved to Championship standard. In 2019, the club was relegated from the Northern Ireland Football League and joined the Ballymena & Provincial Intermediate League.

== History ==
Sport & Leisure F.C. was founded in 1978 when a group of players approached a local Belfast businessman to provide a kit for their new team and he agreed, with the proviso that his company name, Ulster Sport & Leisure Club, appeared on the shirts. The club adopted the name "Sport & Leisure", which remained until 2019, despite the disappearance of the original business much earlier. The name "Swifts" was added when a number of players from Dunmurry League side Belfast Swifts F.C. left to join Sport & Leisure.

Admittance to the Amateur League was dependent on the club having its own pitch, and this was achieved in 1990, when they secured a pitch at Allen Park, Antrim. The club acquired the use of Larkfield High School's ground in Belfast in 1991, before opening its own ground at Glen Road Heights in 2001.

In 2003, intermediate status was achieved.

In 2019, Sport & Leisure Swifts announced plans to revive the name of the historic Belfast Celtic club, based in the same area. IFA permission was granted for the name change in advance of the 2019–20 season.

== Honours ==
=== Intermediate honours ===
2007–08 NAFL Division 1B Champions

- Border Cup: 1
  - 2008–09
