= Knockbreda F.C. =

Northern Irish football club

Coordinates: 54.566858°N 5.853529°W

Knockbreda
- Full name: Knockbreda Football Club
- Nickname: Breda
- Founded: 1947
- Ground: Breda Park
- Chairman: David Cain
- Manager: Neil Adair
- League: NCL Premier
- 2025–26: NIFL Premier Intermediate League, 11th of 14
Home colours	Away colours

Knockbreda Football Club (formerly Knockbreda Parish) is an intermediate-level, Northern Irish football club who currently play in the NCL Premier, following relegation from the NIFL Championship in 2024. They hail from Belfast and play their home matches at Breda Park, on the Upper Braniel Road located in the east of the city. The club was formed after the Second World War, c. 1947. and played in the Irish Churches' League before joining the Northern Amateur Football League in 1989. Intermediate status was achieved on promotion to Division 1B in 1997. In 2009, the club was admitted to the IFA Championship

== History ==
Knockbreda Football Club was formed in 1947. Originally Knockbreda Parish, they played their football for 42 years in the Irish Churches' League, before joining the Northern Amateur Football League in 1989. Starting in Division 2C, ‘Breda won promotion of 2A in the first three seasons.

Off the field, the committee realised they would have to make some major changes in order to become an Intermediate Club. In 1996, they acquired the current facilities at Upper Braniel, and after winning 2A, were promoted to 1B that same season. Promotion to 1A soon followed, and the club enjoyed a three-year stint at that level, before joining the Premier Division in 2000. After relegation in 2007, the club spent a year in 1A before promotion to the re-vamped IFA Championship 2 in 2009. During the spell in the NIAL, the club won the Clarence Cup twice, the Border Cup once, but by far the greatest success was the WKD Irish Intermediate Cup in 2009. The early driving force behind the club was one of its founders, Fred Duke who died in 2010. For the last two decades the club's main driving force, beginning in the Churches' League right up the IFA Championship, has been one of the current directors and Secretary, Colin Russell.

After four years in Championship 2, in 2012–13 the club won promotion to Championship 1 for the first time.

The club for a while was well known for "Beau" a Labrador dog who would act as "Balldog" at home games.

In the 2022–23 season, despite finishing bottom of the NIFL Championship, the club would be spared automatic relegation due to Warrenpoint Towns enforced relegation. The club would defeat Ballymacash Rangers 4–2 over two legs in the promotion/relegation play off to retain their Championship status.

The following season, the club would be relegated in April 2024 following a defeat to Ballyclare Comrades, ending Bredas 11-year stay in the second tier, having spent much of the season rooted to the foot of the table.

On 24 December 2025, former player Callum McVeigh died aged 23. McVeigh had left the club a month prior to join Killyleagh.

== Current squad ==
Note: Flags indicate national team as defined under FIFA eligibility rules; some limited exceptions apply. Players may hold more than one non-FIFA nationality.

No.	Pos.	Nation	Player
1	GK	NIR	Ryan Dalzell
2	DF	NIR	Nathan Clarke
4	MF	NIR	Johnny Newell
5	DF	NIR	Kyle Anderson
6	MF	NIR	Peter McDermott
7	MF	NIR	Lucas Morrison
8	MF	NIR	Ashton McDermott (Captain)
9	FW	NIR	Francis Nolan
10	FW	NIR	Jay Patterson

No.	Pos.	Nation	Player
11	MF	NIR	Darren Smyth
12	DF	NIR	Cormac Lawlor
16	DF	NIR	Conor Quinn
17	FW	NIR	Louis Blackstock
18	FW	NIR	Jay Thompson
19	FW	BEN	Élie Akobeto
20	DF	NIR	Elliott McKim
21	DF	NIR	Ross Murphy
22	MF	NIR	Bobby Higgins

== Honours ==
=== Intermediate honours ===
- IFA Championship 2 (level 3): 1
  - 2012–13
- Irish Intermediate Cup: 1
  - 2008–09
- Border Cup: 1
  - 2004–05
