= Riada Stadium =

Stadium in Northern Ireland

- Interactive map of Riada Stadium
- Coordinates: 55°03′42″N 6°29′54″W
- Capacity: 218 seated + 5534 standing
- Surface: Grass

The Riada Stadium is a purpose-built sports facility in Ballymoney, County Antrim, Northern Ireland. The football teams Glebe Rangers and Ballymoney United share the stadium.
