= Wakehurst F.C. =

Association football club in Northern Ireland

Wakehurst
- Full name: Wakehurst Football Club
- Nickname(s): The 'Hurst
- Founded: 1969
- Ground: Ballymena Showgrounds
- Manager: Aaron Cowan
- League: Ballymena & Provincial Football League
- 2018–19: Ballymena & Provincial Football League, 11th
Home colours

Wakehurst Football Club are a Northern Irish, intermediate football club who currently play in the Ballymena & Provincial Football League. The club, founded in 1969, hails from Ballymena, although home matches are played at Moyola Park's ground at Mill Meadow. Wakehurst formerly played at the second pitch at the Ballymena Showgrounds, home of Ballymena United, but for 2009–10 this pitch was deemed not to meet the criteria for the Championship, and home games were played at the ground of Tobermore United in Tobermore, County Londonderry, for that season; Wakehurst moved to Castledawson for 2010–11. It is the club's intention eventually to return to Ballymena. In 2016, the club was relegated from the Northern Ireland Football League and spent a season in the Ballymena & Provincial Football League before announcing their withdrawal from the competition.

Club colours are black, and white (home) and blue (away).

The club is currently managed by Aaron Cowan.

The club returned to the Ballymena & Provincial League for the 2016–17 season and were joined by fellow Championship 2 drop outs, Glebe Rangers and Coagh United. At the end of the season they announced their withdrawal from football although indicated that it would be a one-year hiatus rather than permanent.

The club played at junior level in the Ballymena & District League and Northern Amateur League until stepping up to intermediate football in 2003.

== Players ==
=== Current First Team Squad ===
As of

Note: Flags indicate national team as defined under FIFA eligibility rules; some limited exceptions apply. Players may hold more than one non-FIFA nationality.

| No. | Pos. | Nation | Player |
|---|---|---|---|
| — | GK | (Northern Ireland) NIR | Greg Shannon |
| — | GK | (Northern Ireland) NIR | Andy Findlay |
| — | GK | (Northern Ireland) NIR | Dean Adams |
| — | DF | (Northern Ireland) NIR | Kyle Crawford |
| — | DF | (Northern Ireland) NIR | Kurtis McCartney |
| — | DF | (Northern Ireland) NIR | Peter McClure |
| — | DF | (Northern Ireland) NIR | Andrew Millar |
| — | DF | (Northern Ireland) NIR | Corey Price |
| — | DF | (Northern Ireland) NIR | Anthony Shaw |
| — | DF | (Northern Ireland) NIR | Niall Swann |

| No. | Pos. | Nation | Player |
|---|---|---|---|
| — | DF | (Northern Ireland) NIR | Conor Ross |
| — | MF | (Northern Ireland) NIR | Ryan Bamber |
| — | MF | (Northern Ireland) NIR | Andrew Laughlin |
| — | MF | (Northern Ireland) NIR | Nicky Black |
| — | MF | (Northern Ireland) NIR | David McLaughlin |
| — | MF | (Northern Ireland) NIR | Steven Mellon |
| — | MF | (Northern Ireland) NIR | David Johnston |
| — | MF | (Northern Ireland) NIR | Aaran Weir |

== Honours ==
=== Junior honours ===
- County Antrim Junior Shield: 1
  - 1989–90
