= Mill Meadow =

Stadium in Castledawson, Northern Ireland

Coordinates: 54°46.8093′N 6°33.3863′W

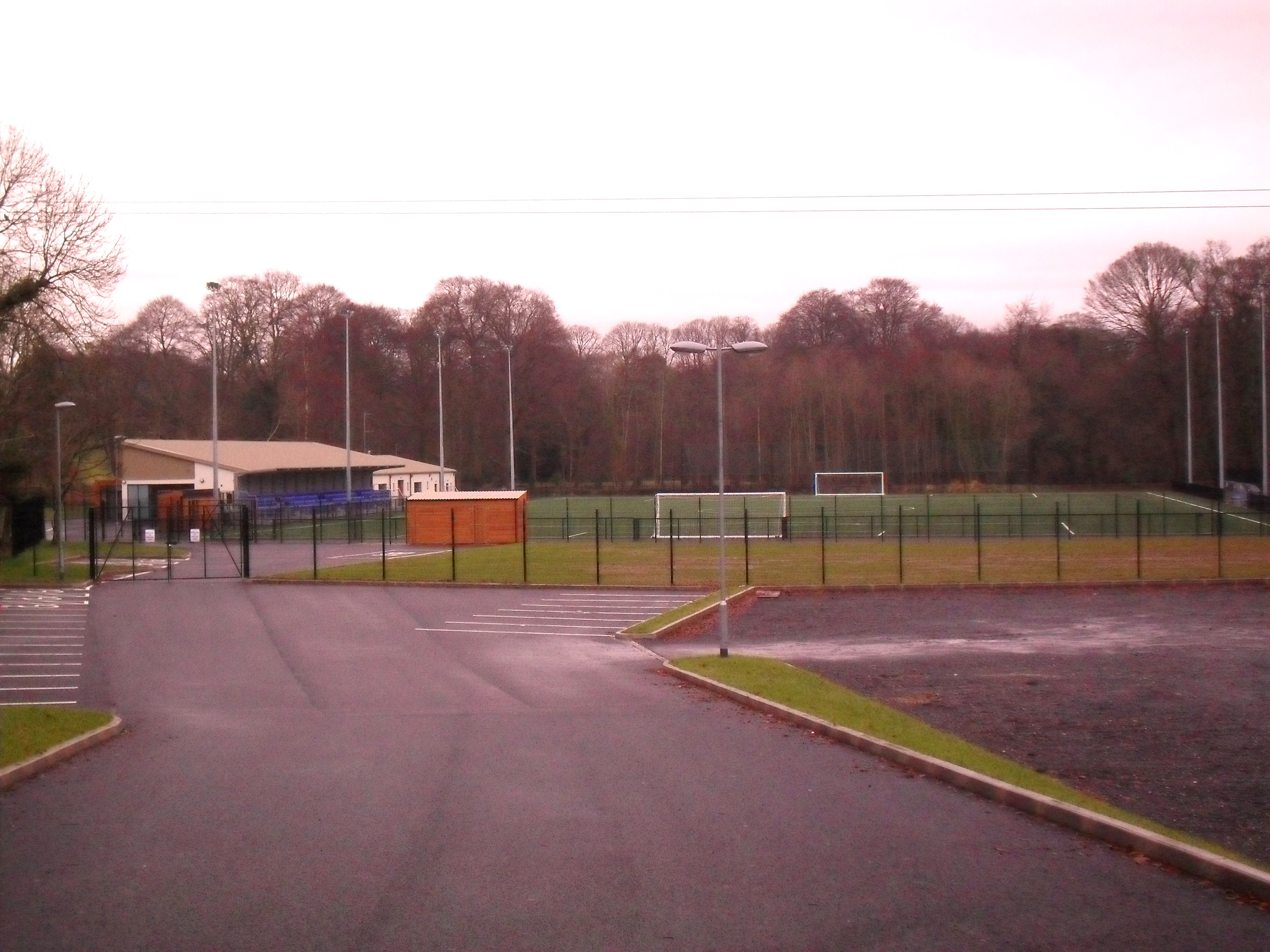
- Interactive map of Mill Meadow
- Full name: Mill Meadow
- Location: Castledawson, Northern Ireland
- Owner: Moyola Park F.C.
- Surface: Artificial

Construction
- Built: 2010

Tenants
- Moyola Park F.C. Wakehurst F.C.

Mill Meadow (known as the H.A.J Stadium for sponsorship reasons) is a football stadium in Castledawson, County Londonderry, Northern Ireland. It is the home stadium of local football team Moyola Park F.C. It hosted its first competitive match on 16 January 2010, when Moyola Park hosted Lurgan Celtic in an IFA Championship 2 fixture. Moyola Park had previously played at the eponymous Moyola Park.

The new ground includes a "3G" artificial pitch and was financed in part by a grant of £1.55m from Sport Northern Ireland, with other funding provided by Magherafelt District Council, the Trustees of the Chichester Club, the Moyola Park club itself and several individuals. The total cost was almost £2m.

Mill Meadow is also used by Wakehurst F.C.

Mill Meadow was also used to host the 2011–12 and 2012–13 Irish Intermediate Cup and Irish Junior Cup finals. In September 2012 the ground hosted 2 fixtures in a UEFA Under 17 Ladies' Mini Tournament – England v Israel and N.Ireland v Italy.

In February 2023, the ground was closed while the pitch underwent improvements. Moyola Park played at Fortwilliam Park, Tobermore, during this time.
