= Glebe Rangers F.C. =

Association football club in Northern Ireland

Glebe Rangers
- Full name: Glebe Rangers Football Club
- Founded: 1989
- Ground: Riada Stadium, Ballymoney
- Capacity: 1,000 (218 seated)
- Manager: Jason Wilmont
- League: Ballymena & Provincial Football League
- 2018–19: Ballymena & Provincial Football League, 2nd
Home colours	Away colours

Glebe Rangers Football Club is an intermediate, Northern Irish football club playing in the Ballymena & Provincial Intermediate League. They play their home games at the Riada Stadium, Ballymoney.

== Admission to the League ==
After Omagh Town closed at the end of the 2004–05 season, the place left by their absence was not filled. Instead, it was decided that a club from the Intermediate League Second Division (in this case, Ballymoney United) was allowed to stay in the First Division instead of being relegated, with only 11 clubs playing in the Second Division for one season. At the end of the 2005–06 season, Glebe Rangers entered a two-legged play-off with Derry side Trojans to determine the vacant 12th place in the Irish Second Division. Rangers won this play-off 9–5 on aggregate to claim the place in the league. Glebe formerly played in the Ballymena and Provincial League.

The current manager is Jason Wilmont who replaced Peter Cairns in 2014.

In 2016 the club was relegated from the Northern Ireland Football League.
