= The Showgrounds (Limavady) =

Football stadium in Limavady, Northern Ireland

Coordinates: 55°02′57.26″N 6°56′12.39″W

The Showgrounds, Limavady
- Interactive map of The Showgrounds, Limavady
- Full name: The Showgrounds
- Location: Limavady, Northern Ireland
- Owner: Limavady United F.C.
- Surface: Grass

Tenant
- Limavady United F.C.

The Showgrounds is a football stadium in Limavady, County Londonderry, Northern Ireland. It is the home ground of Limavady United. The stadium has a capacity of 524, including 274 seated.

The Showgrounds were originally part of a large area of open parkland within the town, which was fully enclosed and separated from the remainder of the playing fields by Limavady United in the early 1980s.

The football club created an entrance to the ground from the Rathmore Road and developed the venue by building a club house, which houses a club bar, beer garden, function room and team dressing rooms as well two blocks of two turnstiles to access the ground from the car park.

The ground has one stand, running partially along the Scroggy side of the pitch, providing seating for 274 spectators. The stand was built in the mid-1990s to enable the club to step up into senior football but has fallen into disrepair since they dropped back down to intermediate level in 2008 and some of the seats have become damaged. The remainder of the ground is undeveloped with a single tier of paving around the perimeter wall of the pitch. Many spectators chose to watch matches from the paved area beside the clubhouse at the Rathmore Road end.

Limavady's lease on the venue expires in 2029, which means they cannot get grant aid funding to develop the ground to Irish Premier League standard. The long-term future of the stadium is uncertain with the owners planning to sell when the lease expires, although Limavady United have first refusal.
