= Limavady United F.C. =

Association football club in Northern Ireland

Limavady United
- Full name: Limavady United Football & Athletic Club
- Nicknames: "The Roesiders", "The Lims"
- Founded: c. 1955
- Ground: The Showgrounds, Limavady; County Londonderry
- Capacity: 1,500 (274 seated)
- Chairman: Geoff Ferris
- Manager: Paul Owens
- League: NIFL Premiership
- 2025–26: NIFL Championship, 1st of 12 (champions; promoted)
- Website: http://www.limavadyunitedfc.com/
Home colours	Away colours

Limavady United Football Club is a semi-professional, Northern Irish football club playing in the NIFL Premiership. The club comes from Limavady, County Londonderry, and plays home matches at the Showgrounds. Club colours are royal blue shirts with white trim, blue socks and royal blue shorts. Away colours are all yellow. The current manager is Paul Owens, with assistant manager and ex player Adriana Taggart.

== History ==
There have been many football clubs in Limavady, dating back to 1880, when Alexander, a founding member of the Irish Football Association was formed by the Alexander Cricket Club. Alexander merged with another local club, Wanderers, in 1884 to form Limavady F.C. Club historian David Brewster, however, dates the current Limavady club's formation to 1955.

After a long time as a junior team, the club joined the senior Irish Football League in 1997–98, and reached its first Irish Cup semi-final in over a century in 2003–04. In 2008, the club lost its senior status when it failed to gain admission to the new IFA Premiership.

In April 2013, three players received suspensions after being found guilty of breaching IFA betting rules on one of the club's league matches.

The club won the NIFL Championship 2 in the 2015–2016 season but were denied promotion to NIFL Championship 1 as they were unsuccessful in applying for a licence. However they were promoted as winners of the Premier Intermediate League in 2016–2017. They would be relegated at the end of the 2018/19 season.

Following a stay in the PIL, the club would make their NIFL Championship return following a 3–0 win away to Lisburn Distillery, also securing the league trophy.

On 18 April 2026, Limavady United were crowned champions of NIFL Championship for the 2025–26 season, and were promoted to play in the NIFL Premiership for the first time since 2008, after defeating Annagh United 2-0.

=== Carlos Tevez loan ===
In September 2011, the club vice chairman David Brewster issued a fax to Manchester City, offering to take Argentinian International Carlos Tevez on loan after the player had refused to go on as a substitute in a UEFA Champions League fixture. The club offer suggested that they would ensure Tevez stayed match fit and would avoid being cup tied, but asked that City continued to pay his reported £200,000 per week wages, a figure higher than Limavady's entire turnover for a year.

The offer, although meant as tongue in cheek became global headline news with some news agencies believing the offer to be a serious one. The story gained the club brief worldwide recognition although Manchester City themselves did not respond.

== Current squad ==
As of 1 March 2026

Note: Flags indicate national team as defined under FIFA eligibility rules; some limited exceptions apply. Players may hold more than one non-FIFA nationality.

No.	Pos.	Nation	Player
3	DF	NIR	Matthew Walker
4	DF	IRL	Kieran Farren
5	DF	NIR	Tiarnan Boorman
7	MF	NIR	Philip Lowry
8	MF	NIR	Stephen Lowry
11	DF	NIR	Lewis Tosh
14	MF	NIR	Connor McCloskey
16	MF	NIR	Ruairi Boorman
17	MF	NIR	John Butcher
19	DF	NIR	Rodney Brown

No.	Pos.	Nation	Player
23	MF	NIR	Jake Martin
24	DF	NIR	Adam Mullan
27	GK	IRL	Fintan Doherty
31	GK	NIR	Martin Gallagher
33	FW	IRL	Michael Harris
TBA	MF	NIR	Sean Carlin
TBA	MF	NIR	Aaron Jarvis
TBA	DF	NIR	Stephen O'Donnell
TBA	FW	NIR	Leon Boyd
TBA	FW	IRL	Oisin Duffy

== Honours ==
Former crest

=== Senior honours ===
- County Londonderry Cup/North West Senior Cup: 6
  - 1993–94, 1998–99, 2004–05, 2015–16, 2018–19, 2023–24

=== Intermediate honours ===
- Irish League B Division|NIFL Championship: 3
  - 1983–84, 1992–93, 2025–26
- NIFL Championship 2: 1
  - 2015–16
- NIFL Premier Intermediate League: 2
  - 2016–17, 2023–24
- Irish Intermediate Cup: 3
  - 1973–74, 1995–96, 2016–17
- George Wilson Cup: 1
  - 1975–76
- Craig Memorial Cup: 10
  - 1992–93, 1993–94, 1994–95, 2008–09, 2010–11, 2012–13, 2014–15, 2015–16, 2016–17, 2023–24
- B Division Knock-out Cup: 2
  - 1992–93, 1995–96

=== Junior honours ===
- Irish Junior Cup: 1
  - 1963–64
- North West City Cup: 2
  - 1960–61, 1966–67
- North West Junior League: 1
  - 1968–69
