= Armagh City F.C. =

Association football club in Northern Ireland

Armagh City FC
- Full name: Armagh City Football Club
- Nickname: The Eagles
- Founded: 1964 (as Milford Everton)
- Ground: Holm Park, Armagh; County Armagh
- Capacity: 2,000
- Chairman: Ryan Kelly
- Manager: Dave Rogers
- League: NIFL Championship
- 2025–26: NIFL Championship, 12th of 12
Home colours	Away colours

Armagh City Football Club, referred to as Armagh City, is a semi-professional, Northern Irish football club playing in the NIFL Championship. Armagh City are a part of the Mid-Ulster Football Association. The club plays in the Irish Cup.

== History ==
The club was founded in 1964 as Milford Everton in the village of Milford, just outside Armagh city. The original name was in honour of the founders' favourite English team, Everton. Milford was the village were the penalty kick was first introduced in 1890 when local goalkeeper William McCrum suggested a way to combat illegal challenges near to goal. Milford Everton eventually bought and refurbished the McCrum Institute in the early 1980s as they strove to improve facilities for the 'B' Division. The club was renamed Armagh City after relocating to Armagh in 1988. They played at the Mill Field, Armagh from 1988 to 1993, when they moved to their current ground, Holm Park. They achieved senior status in 1999, but reverted to intermediate status in 2003 when the Irish Premier League was established and the number of senior clubs was reduced from 20 to 16. In 2005, however, City gained promotion to the Premier League, but after three more seasons at senior level, the club failed to gain a place in the 12-club IFA Premiership and reverted once more to intermediate status as a member of the IFA Championship. The club's colours are azure and black stripes. Former player Marty Rice was named first team manager on 10 July 2010, having been assistant to Ivor McGucken at the start of the 2009–10 season.

During the 2011–12 season Armagh City entered into negotiations with various bodies including the IFA, Armagh City and District Council and SportNI to secure funding to replace their grass pitch with the latest, FIFA approved, 3rd generation pitch. The pitch was laid in summer 2013 and opened in September 2013. The first game for the first team was on 14 September 2013 - a 5–1 win against Lurgan Celtic in the Bob Radcliffe Cup.

Luke Grimley was the last player to score on the old Holm Park in a 1–0 win over rivals Loughgall which clinched the Championship reserve league title managed by Mickey O’Neill and captained by Cillian Sheridan, while Shea McGerrigan was the first player to score in the new Holm Park with a 5–1 win over Lurgan Celtic.

In the 2011–12 season Armagh City F.C. Youth (U18) created history by winning their first ever national trophy, the Harry Cavan Irish Youth Cup, defeating Cliftonville 1–0 in the final with a goal from Barry Quinn, the side was managed by John Hynds and Martin Grimley, and captained by Matthew Hynds. On the run to the final the Eagles defeated, Ballymoney United 9–0, Woodvale F.C. 7-0 and Glenavon F.C. 3–1. In a successful year for the youth side they also lifted the League title undefeated and the League Cup completing an impressive domestic treble.

In the 2013–14 season Armagh City F.C. won the double by winning the league and Bob Radcliffe Cup, the side, captained by Liam Cullen also reached the Intermediate Cup Final but were defeated by Bangor F.C. 2–1.

The club over the years has reached several Mid Ulster Cup finals with a reasonably large following and have came close to promotion to the NIFL Premiership. The club was relegated to the Premier Intermediate League in the 2016–17 season following a disappointing 7–1 loss to Newry City in the championship relegation play off over two legs. Manager Marty Rice then resigned.

In the summer of 2017 former Cliftonville player Joe Kerr took over as manager of the club for the 2017/18 season with Alex Clifford and Mickey O'Neill as his assistants. Kerr departed from the club in June 2021, with his successor, Shea Campbell being appointed the following day.

In the 2023–24 season, Armagh finished second in the Premier Intermediate with 52 points. This gave them a chance of promotion to the NIFL Championship via the promotion play-offs. Armagh faced Dergview. The first leg resulted in a draw, whilst the second ended in a penalty shoot-out. Armagh won the shoot-out 6–5 to secure a place in the second tier of Northern Irish football for the following season.

== Current squad ==
Note: Flags indicate national team as defined under FIFA eligibility rules; some limited exceptions apply. Players may hold more than one non-FIFA nationality.

No.	Pos.	Nation	Player
1	GK	NIR	Conner Byrne
3	MF	NIR	Shea Geraghty
5	DF	IRL	Anto Reilly
8	MF	NIR	Shea Conway
11	MF	NIR	Ruairi Duffy
12	FW	IRL	Ethan Doogan-Ballantine
13	MF	NIR	Jack Clarke
14	MF	NIR	Ethan Jordan
15	MF	IRL	Jonathan Carlin
16	MF	NIR	Odhran Smyth

No.	Pos.	Nation	Player
17	MF	IRL	Ugo Anny-Nzekwue
18	MF	NIR	Marc McConnell
19	MF	IRL	Bradley Okaidja
20	FW	NIR	Stefan Lavery
23	MF	IRL	Noeem Oladunjoye
29	DF	IRL	Ben Mullen
41	GK	IRL	Keith Gaynor
TBA	FW	IRL	Senyo Clarke
TBA	FW	ITA	Leo Anthony

== Honours ==
=== Senior honours ===
- Mid-Ulster Cup: 1
  - 2000–01

=== Intermediate honours ===
- Irish First Division (tier 2): 1
  - 2004–05
- NIFL Championship 2 (tier 3): 1
  - 2013–14
- Bob Radcliffe Cup : 5
  - 1991–92, 2004–05, 2013–14, 2015–16, 2020–21

=== Junior honours ===
- Mid-Ulster League: 1
  - 1973–74
- Mid-Ulster Shield: 1
  - 1969–70
- Harry Cavan Irish Youth Cup: 1
  - 2011–12
- Championship Reserve League: 1
  - 2012-13
