= Warrenpoint Town F.C. =

Association football club in Northern Ireland

Coordinates: 54°7′4.318″N 6°15′48.186″W

Warrenpoint Town
- Full name: Warrenpoint Town Football Club
- Nickname: The Point
- Founded: 1987; 39 years ago
- Ground: Milltown, Warrenpoint
- Capacity: 1,450 (150 seated)
- Chairman: Andrew Talbot
- Manager: Gary Boyle
- League: NIFL Championship
- 2025–26: NIFL Championship, 9th of 12
- Website: www.warrenpointtownfc.co.uk
Home colours	Away colours

Warrenpoint Town Football Club, referred to as Warrenpoint Town, or "The Point", is a semi-professional Northern Irish football club that plays in the NIFL Championship. Warrenpoint Town are a part of the Mid-Ulster Football Association. The club competes in the Irish Cup.

== History ==
The club was formed in 1987, and for the first 23 years of its existence played at regional league level. After being crowned champions of the Mid-Ulster Football League Intermediate A division in the 2009–10 season, the club was elected to Championship 2 for the first time by the Championship Committee. During their first season, they defeated Cliftonville 3–1 on penalties at Solitude in the fifth round of the 2010–11 Irish Cup – at the time, the biggest result in the club's history. It went on to become a very successful season for the club, as they adapted to the step-up to Championship 2 emphatically, winning the division by nine points and losing only one of the 30 games in the process. This secured their second consecutive promotion, elevating them to Championship 1, the second tier of Northern Irish football.

In their first season in Championship 1 they found the next step up more difficult to adapt to but still avoided relegation, finishing in 12th place – nine points clear of the relegation zone. At the start of the 2012–13 season the demise of Newry City allowed the club to inherit some of Newry's players – strengthening their squad substantially. They eventually finished as runners-up, and qualified for the promotion play-off against Donegal Celtic, who had finished second-bottom in the Premiership. Warrenpoint won the tie on the away goals rule after it ended 2–2 on aggregate, to reach the top flight for the first time in the club's history. This rounded off a very successful few years for the club, going from the Mid Ulster Football League Intermediate A division to the Premiership in only four seasons.

In their first season in the top flight, when many had expected the club to go straight back down, the club played their home fixtures at Dungannon Swifts' ground, Stangmore Park, until 30 November 2013 because their home ground did not meet Premiership criteria. During this period the ground was upgraded to top flight standard and the club managed to survive that season.

In 2014–15, the Point did not have an overall good season, finishing in 11th position and suffered a difficult time against Bangor in the Relegation Play-Off losing 2–0 in the first league at Clandeboye Park before winning 2–0 at Milltown and beating the Seasiders on penalties.

In 2015–16, Warrenpoint Town suffered a poor start to their season, being bottom of the table with just four points at Christmas. Following the sale of star striker Daniel Hughes to Cliftonville, the club received Martin Murray and Johnny McMurray from Cliftonville as part of the deal to take Hughes to Solitude. The club had a dramatic upturn in fortunes, first reaching a league cup semi final, before losing 1–0 to Cliftonville after extra-time, and in one of the biggest shocks in Irish league history, the Point beat Glentoran 4–0 at The Oval. The Point were relegated on the final day of the season. While leading 1–0 against Dungannon Swifts and needing a win to stay up, Warrenpoint defender Jordan Dane collided with Andrew Mitchell, and despite Dane falling over, referee Ross Dunlop awarded Dungannon a penalty, much to the disbelief of the home support and players. Mitchell missed the penalty but scored on the rebound at the second attempt, to relegate Warrenpoint Town with the last kick of the game sending them back to NIFL Championship 1. Mid-season the following year, manager Barry Gray took the decision to step down and help the club with board matters and made the decision to appoint first team coach Matthew Tipton as manager. Tipton took the club to the top of the table in NIFL Championship 1 by Christmas time and had remarkably beaten Glenavon 3–1 in the Mid-Ulster Cup to reach their first ever Mid-Ulster Cup final. The club sealed their return to the NIFL Premiership with a 3–2 win over Institute in April 2017.

The club made their championship return following a 12th-placed finish in the NIFL Premiership in April 2022. The club in the 2022–23 season finished second in the NIFL Championship and were due to take on Dungannon Swifts in the league's promotion play-off; however, the club's application for a promotion licence (to play in the NIFL Premiership) was rejected as well as their Championship licence (to play in the NIFL Championship or NIFL Premier Intermediate League). According to the club, the licences were rejected because of an unpaid tax bill which the club paid after it became aware of the liability. The club instead dropped down to the NIFL Premier Intermediate League following an agreement with the Irish FA.

Manager Barry Gray, in his second spell at the club following his first managerial stint from 2006 to 2016, departed the club in January 2024, amid speculation of his appointment at Newry City.

The club would start life in Intermediate football strongly initially with a significantly different squad to the previous campaign, with further key players such as Fra McCaffrey following former boss Barry Gray to Newry throughout the season. The club would finish the season in 10th place, with quite a young squad in what was a difficult campaign.

== Current squad ==
Note: Flags indicate national team as defined under FIFA eligibility rules; some limited exceptions apply. Players may hold more than one non-FIFA nationality.

No.	Pos.	Nation	Player
1	GK	NIR	Daniel Devine
2	MF	IRL	Aaron Corish
3	DF	NIR	Conall Murray
4	DF	NIR	Chris Crane
5	DF	NIR	John Boyle
6	MF	NIR	Matthew Lynch
7	MF	NIR	Jim O'Hanlon
8	MF	NIR	Rory Powell
9	FW	IRL	Dauda Shotayo
10	FW	IRL	James McElligott
11	FW	NIR	Diarmuid O'Hanlon

No.	Pos.	Nation	Player
12	GK	IRL	Declan Murphy
14	MF	NIR	Shane Haughey
16	FW	IRL	Colm Carney
18	DF	IRL	Ciaran O'Reilly
19	FW	NIR	Darren Doherty
24	FW	NIR	Declan Loye
25	MF	NIR	Conall McGrandles
26	DF	IRL	Alex Dunne
33	DF	IRL	Jeff Nwodo
99	FW	IRL	Michael Leddy
TBA	DF	NIR	Callan Farley

== Honours ==
=== Senior honours ===
- NIFL Championship: 1
  - 2016–17
- Mid-Ulster Cup: 2
  - 2016–17, 2021–22

=== Intermediate honours ===
- IFA Championship 2 (level 3): 1
  - 2010–11
  - 2024-25 NIFL Premier Intermediate League
- Mid-Ulster Football League: 3
  - 2000–01, 2007–08, 2009–10
