= Barney Bowers =

Northern Irish footballer (born 1959)

Personal information
- Full name: Robert Bowers
- Date of birth: 19 August 1959 (age 67)
- Place of birth: Belfast, Northern Ireland
- Height: 1.75 m (5 ft 9 in)
- Position: Midfielder

Senior career*
Years	Team	Apps	(Gls)
1978–1978	Cliftonville		
1978–1981	Derby County	0	(0)
1981–1995	Glentoran	524	(108)
1995–1997	Ards	25	(1)
Total		549	(109)

International career
1987–1989	Irish League XI	3	(0)
- * Club domestic league appearances and goals

Robert Bowers (born 19 August 1959), better known as Barney Bowers, is a former professional footballer who played as a midfielder for Derby County, Cliftonville, Ards and Glentoran.

He has won every medal possible in the Irish League during his career for Glentoran, where he played from 1981 to 1995. He is also in the club's top 10 players in terms of appearances, ranking 7th, and is one of 27 players to score over 100 goals for the club.

== Early years and family ==
Robert Bowers is the second child of George "Geordie" Bowers (1933–2012) and Christina Bowers (1938–1987). He was born on the 19 August 1959. He has three sisters and three brothers. He grew up in east Belfast. He was given the nickname Barney by friends and family, which he became better known by.

== Career ==
=== Early career (1978–1981) ===
As an 18-year-old Barney was a part of the Glentoran scouting network, only to be signed by Cliftonville. Derby manager Tommy Docherty signed him for £25,000.

Despite an offer from Swindon Town, Barney opted to return to Belfast, and join his boyhood favourites at The Oval in August 1981.

=== Glentoran (1981–1995) ===
Bowers made his debut in a match against Dundalk at home in August 1981, which finished 0-0.

Despite missing so much Barney still amassed over 500 appearances for Glentoran after joining from Derby County in August 1981, but for those two broken legs and a fractured cheekbone Barney would have been the record holder for Glentoran appearances.

In 1992 he led Glentoran to the League title, the only medal he had previously not won in the Irish League, having missed out on a medal during their double year, when out with a broken leg.

As of 2019, he is 7th place on the list of most appearances for Glentoran with 524. This also means he is a member of the 250 Club. He is also on the list for top goal scorers with 108.

=== Ards (1995–1997) ===
Bowers scored Ards only goal in their 1997 UEFA Intertoto Cup campaign.

He is the record holder for European appearances for a Glentoran player & Irish League player, with a number of appearances for Ards in Europe towards the end of his career.

=== Retirement from league football ===
Since retiring from league football, Bowers has still appeared in charity games. In July 2008, the Glentoran Legends team was set up, in which Barney has been a part of since the first match.

== Personal life ==
Bowers lives in Belfast, Northern Ireland with his wife. He has two sons.

== Career statistics ==
Appearances and goals by club, season and competition
Club	Season	League			National cup		League cup		Continental		Other		Total	
Club	Season	Division	Apps	Goals	Apps	Goals	Apps	Goals	Apps	Goals	Apps	Goals	Apps	Goals
Cliftonville	1977–1978	Irish League	0	0	0	0	0	0	0	0	0	0	0	0
Cliftonville	Total		0	0	0	0	0	0	0	0	0	0	0	0
Derby County	1978–1979	Football League First Division	0	0	0	0	0	0	0	0	0	0	0	0
Derby County	1979–1980	Football League First Division	0	0	0	0	0	0	0	0	0	0	0	0
Derby County	1980–1981	Football League First Division	0	0	0	0	0	0	0	0	0	0	0	0
Derby County	Total		0	0	0	0	0	0	0	0	0	0	0	0
Glentoran	1981–1982	Irish League											44	4
Glentoran	1982–1983	Irish League											37	12
Glentoran	1983–1984	Irish League											51	16
Glentoran	1984–1985	Irish League											50	18
Glentoran	1985–1986	Irish League											22	7
Glentoran	1986–1987	Irish League											28	5
Glentoran	1987–1988	Irish League											18	3
Glentoran	1988–1989	Irish League											35	3
Glentoran	1989–1990	Irish League											55	7
Glentoran	1990–1991	Irish League											43	3
Glentoran	1991–1992	Irish League											39	7
Glentoran	1992–1993	Irish League											40	6
Glentoran	1993–1994	Irish League											40	10
Glentoran	1994–1995	Irish League											21	3
Glentoran	Total												524	108
Ards	1995–1996	Irish League		0		0		0		0		0		0
Ards	1996–1997	Irish League		0		0		0		1		0		1
Ards	Total			0		0		0		1		0	25	1
Career total													549	109

== Honours ==
Glentoran

- IFA Premiership: 1991–92
- Irish Cup: 1989–90
- Irish League Cup: 1988–89, 1990–91
- County Antrim Shield: 1984–85, 1986–87
- Irish FA Charity Shield: 1992–93 (shared with Glenavon)
- Gold Cup: 1982–83, 1986–87, 1991–92, 1994–95
- Ulster Cup: 1981–82, 1982–83, 1983–84, 1988–89, 1989–90
- Floodlit Cup: 1989–90
