= Ronnie McFall =

Northern Irish footballer and manager

Personal information
- Full name: Ronald Joseph McFall
- Date of birth: 3 October 1947 (age 79)
- Place of birth: Portadown, Northern Ireland
- Position: Left-back

Senior career*
| Years | Team | Apps | (Gls) |
| 1964–1965 | Portadown | 4 | (0) |
| 1965–1967 | Dundee United | 0 | (0) |
| 1967–1968 | Ards | | |
| 1968–1975 | Portadown | | |
| 1975–1979 | Glentoran | 72 | (0) |

International career
- Northern Ireland Youth
| 1974 | Irish League XI | 1 | (0) |

Managerial career
- 1979–1984: Glentoran
- 1986–2016: Portadown
- 2018–2019: Glentoran
- * Club domestic league appearances and goals

Ronald Joseph McFall MBE (born 3 October 1947) is a former football player and former manager of NIFL Premiership sides Glentoran and Portadown. He was most notably manager of hometown club Portadown for 29 years from December 1986 until his resignation in March 2016. At the time of his resignation he was the longest-serving manager in European club football, having held the record ever since Alex Ferguson stood down as Manchester United manager in 2013. He had two spells managing Glentoran, between 1979 and 1984 and 2018 and 2019.

As a player, McFall represented Portadown (twice), Dundee United, Ards, Glentoran (becoming Irish League champion with the latter). Managing in Irish League football for over 30 years, McFall is amongst the most successful managers in the history of the Irish League having claimed five league titles, four Irish Cups and 20 other trophies during his time with Glentoran and Portadown. McFall was the first person to be rewarded the freedom of the Armagh, Banbridge and Craigavon area for his immense contribution to sport. He is also a five-time Manager of the Year award winner, and the uncle of current Portadown defender Ross Redman.

== Playing career ==
=== Club ===
As a player Ronnie McFall played as a full-back. He made his debut for Portadown in August 1964 in a Mid-Ulster derby match against Glenavon in the Ulster Cup. The following season he was signed by Dundee United for £4,000, where he became a regular in the reserve side but failed to make an appearance for the first team. He was released in April 1967 and went on to play for Ards, Portadown again, and Glentoran.

McFall played in the 1974–75 UEFA Cup for Portadown. He also played in four 1977–78 European Cup games for the Glens, two of which came against a Giovanni Trapattoni led Juventus.

=== International ===
He won Northern Ireland Youth caps and also represented the Irish League against the League of Ireland in 1974.

== Managerial career ==
=== Glentoran (1979–1984) ===
McFall took his first managerial appointment, initially as player-manager, at Glentoran in January 1979. Although he helped the club to an Irish League title in 1981 and an Irish Cup win in 1983 he was sacked in December 1984 after a poor run of results.

=== Portadown (1986–2016) ===
In December 1986, McFall was appointed as manager at Portadown. He established the Ports as challengers for major honours, leading them to their first ever Irish League title in 1990 and first Irish Cup the following year. McFall won 23 trophies with Portadown and is the club's most successful manager of all time.

McFall was appointed as the Northern Ireland U23 manager for the International Challenge Trophy Series in 2009. He celebrated 29 years in charge of Portadown in December 2015, and his 1000th league game in November 2013. He resigned as Portadown manager on 5 March 2016, after a shock 3–2 Irish Cup quarter-final defeat at home against second-tier side Lurgan Celtic.

At the time of his retirement from Portadown, McFall had managed a total of 1,764 games in Irish League football, of which 1,483 came with Portadown.

=== Glentoran (2018–2019) ===
He returned to management on 22 February 2018, taking over as Glentoran manager from Gary Haveron who had been sacked the previous day. He was joined by Kieran Harding, Gary Smyth and Paul Leeman. However a poor run of form between October 2018 and January 2019, which saw the club go on its longest winless run in its history, paved the way for McFall's exit on 3 January 2019. He was replaced by Gary Smyth.

=== Statistics ===
(Statistics apply without mid-ulster cup finals excluding finals they won)

| Team | Nation | From | To | Record | | | | |
| Team | Nation | From | To | P | W | D | L | Win % |
|---|---|---|---|---|---|---|---|---|
| Glentoran | Northern Ireland | January 1979 | December 1984 | 237 | 141 | 43 | 53 | 59.49 |
| Portadown | Northern Ireland | 21 December 1986 | 15 March 2016 | 1,407 | 730 | 273 | 404 | 51.88 |
| Glentoran | Northern Ireland | 22 February 2018 | 3 January 2019 | 50 | 16 | 10 | 24 | 32 |
| Total | | | | 1,694 | 887 | 326 | 481 | 52.36 |

== Honours ==
=== As a player ===
Portadown

- Gold Cup: 1971–72
- Texaco Cup: 1973–74
- Carlsberg Cup: 1972–73

Glentoran

- Irish League: 1976–77
- Gold Cup: 1976–77, 1977–78
- Ulster Cup: 1976–77

=== As a manager ===
Glentoran

- Irish League: 1980–81
- Irish Cup: 1982–83
- Gold Cup: 1982–83
- Ulster Cup: 1981–82, 1982–83, 1983–84

Portadown

- Irish League: 1989–90, 1990–91, 1995–96, 2001–02
- Irish Cup: 1990–91, 1998–99, 2004–05
- Irish League Cup: 1995–96, 2008–09
- Gold Cup: 1992–93
- Ulster Cup: 1990–91, 1995–96
- Floodlit Cup: 1990–91, 1992–93, 1994–95
- Mid-Ulster Cup (6): 1992–93, 1993–94, 1994–95, 1997–98, 2001–02, 2002–03
- Charity Shield: 1999
- IFA Championship: 2008–09

Individual

- Manager of the Year: 1981, 1990, 1991, 1996, 2002

== See also ==
- List of football managers with the most matches
