= 1988–89 Floodlit Cup =

Tournament details
- Country: Northern Ireland
- Teams: 16

Final positions
- Champions: Glenavon (1st win)
- Runners-up: Linfield

Tournament statistics
- Matches played: 24
- Goals scored: 76 (3.17 per match)

The 1988–89 Floodlit Cup was the 2nd edition of the Floodlit Cup, a cup competition in Northern Irish football.

Glenavon won the tournament for the 1st time, defeating Linfield 6–1 in the final replay after the original final ended in a 1–1 draw.

== Results ==
=== First round ===
Teams that were at home in the first leg listed on the left.

Team 1	Agg.	Team 2	1st leg	2nd leg
Ards	3–3 (a)	Coleraine	2–2	1–1
Bangor	3–2	Ballymena United	1–2	2–0
Carrick Rangers	3–4	'Larne	1–3	2–1
Cliftonville	4–2	Newry Town	1–2	3–0
Glenavon	3–2	Distillery	3–0	0–2
Glentoran	2–1	Crusaders	1–0	1–1
Linfield	9–1	Omagh Town	3–1	6–0
Portadown	4–4 (a)	Ballyclare Comrades	2–1	2–3

=== Quarter-finals ===
Team 1	Score	Team 2
Bangor	4–0	Larne
Coleraine	2–0 (a.e.t.)	Glentoran
Glenavon	6–0	Portadown
Linfield	1–1 (a.e.t.) (4–2 p)	Cliftonville

=== Semi-finals ===
Team 1	Score	Team 2
Glenavon	3–0	Coleraine
Linfield	0–0 (a.e.t.) (4–3 p)	Bangor

=== Final ===
21 March 1989

Glenavon	1–1 (a.e.t.)	Linfield
Coyle 117'		McGaughey 102'

The Oval, Belfast
Referee: Alan Snoddy (Carryduff)

==== Replay ====
25 April 1989

Glenavon	6–1	Linfield
Ferris 18', 69', 90+4'; Blackledge 47'; McBride 79'; Lowry 90+1'		Knell 86'; McKeown (red card) 74'

The Oval, Belfast
Referee: Alan Snoddy (Carryduff)
