= 1996–97 Floodlit Cup =

Tournament details
- Country: Northern Ireland
- Teams: 16

Final positions
- Champions: Glenavon (2nd win)
- Runners-up: Glentoran

Tournament statistics
- Matches played: 23
- Goals scored: 62 (2.7 per match)

The 1996–97 Floodlit Cup was the 10th edition of the Floodlit Cup, a cup competition in Northern Irish football.

Glenavon won the tournament for the 2nd time, defeating Glentoran 1–0 in the final.

== Results ==
=== First round ===
Team 1	Agg.	Team 2	1st leg	2nd leg
Ballyclare Comrades	0–5	Linfield	0–3	0–2
Ballymena United	2–2 (a.e.t.) (2–3 p)	Glenavon	1–2	1–0
Bangor	1–4	Ards	1–1	0–3
Carrick Rangers	3–5	Glentoran	3–4	0–1
Distillery	1–2	Cliftonville	1–0	0–2
Larne	2–5	Crusaders	1–3	1–2
Newry Town	2–3	Coleraine	2–3	0–0
Omagh Town	2–4	Portadown	1–3	1–1

=== Quarter-finals ===
Team 1	Score	Team 2
Crusaders	2–1 (a.e.t.)	Linfield
Glenavon	4–2	Cliftonville
Glentoran	3–0	Ards
Portadown	1–0	Coleraine

=== Semi-finals ===
Team 1	Score	Team 2
Glenavon	2–0	Crusaders
Glentoran	2–1 (a.e.t.)	Portadown

=== Final ===
8 April 1997

Glenavon	1–0	Glentoran
Doherty 89'

Windsor Park, Belfast
Referee: John Ferry (Derry)
