= 1989–90 Floodlit Cup =

Tournament details
- Country: Northern Ireland
- Teams: 16

Final positions
- Champions: Glentoran (2nd win)
- Runners-up: Linfield

Tournament statistics
- Matches played: 23
- Goals scored: 71 (3.09 per match)

The 1989–90 Floodlit Cup was the 3rd edition of the Floodlit Cup, a cup competition in Northern Irish football.

Glentoran won the tournament for the 2nd time, defeating Linfield 4–2 in the final.

== Results ==
=== First round ===
Teams that were at home in the first leg listed on the left.

Team 1	Agg.	Team 2	1st leg	2nd leg
Ballymena United	2–1	Portadown	0–1	2–0
Cliftonville	6–3	Ards	4–1	2–2
Crusaders	1–2	Carrick Rangers	0–0	1–2
Distillery	0–7	Newry Town	0–1	0–6
Glentoran	5–2	Ballyclare Comrades	5–1	0–1
Larne	2–5	Glenavon	1–1	1–4
Linfield	4–1	Bangor	2–1	2–0
Omagh Town	2–3	Coleraine	1–1	1–2

=== Quarter-finals ===
Team 1	Score	Team 2
Cliftonville	0–2	Glentoran
Coleraine	1–2	Newry Town
Glenavon	2–1	Ballymena United
Linfield	3–1	Carrick Rangers

=== Semi-finals ===
Team 1	Score	Team 2
Glentoran	4–0	Newry Town
Linfield	2–1	Glenavon

=== Final ===
7 March 1990

Linfield	2–4	Glentoran
McGaughey 13'; Bailie 44'		Macartney 29', 32'; Campbell 59'; Caskey 74'

Windsor Park, Belfast
Referee: G. Hyndes (Portadown)
