= 1993–94 Floodlit Cup =

Tournament details
- Country: Northern Ireland
- Teams: 16

Final positions
- Champions: Linfield (1st win)
- Runners-up: Ards

Tournament statistics
- Matches played: 15
- Goals scored: 57 (3.8 per match)

The 1993–94 Floodlit Cup was the 7th edition of the Floodlit Cup, a cup competition in Northern Irish football.

Linfield won the tournament for the 1st time, defeating Ards 3–0 in the final.

== Results ==
=== First round ===
Team 1	Score	Team 2
Ballyclare Comrades	1–3 (a.e.t.)	Glentoran
Ballymena United	1–2	Larne
Bangor	2–0	Portadown
Cliftonville	2–1	Glenavon
Coleraine	4–0	Carrick Rangers
Crusaders	2–3	Distillery
Linfield	4–0	Newry Town
Omagh Town	0–1	Ards

=== Quarter-finals ===
Team 1	Score	Team 2
Bangor	1–3	Cliftonville
Distillery	6–0	Coleraine
Larne	1–3	Ards
Linfield	3–2 (a.e.t.)	Glentoran

=== Semi-finals ===
Team 1	Score	Team 2
Ards	3–2	Cliftonville
Linfield	3–1	Distillery

=== Final ===
21 December 1993

Linfield	3–0	Ards
Doherty 26'; Haylock 50'; Campbell 56'

The Oval, Belfast
Referee: F. McDonald (Newry)
