= 1995–96 Floodlit Cup =

Tournament details
- Country: Northern Ireland
- Teams: 16

Final positions
- Champions: Cliftonville (1st win)
- Runners-up: Glentoran

Tournament statistics
- Matches played: 23
- Goals scored: 71 (3.09 per match)

The 1995–96 Floodlit Cup was the 9th edition of the Floodlit Cup, a cup competition in Northern Irish football.

Cliftonville won the tournament for the 1st time, defeating Glentoran 3–1 in the final.

== Results ==
=== First round ===
Team 1	Agg.	Team 2	1st leg	2nd leg
Ballyclare Comrades	2–4	Portadown	2–1	0–3
Ballymena United	0–3	Crusaders	0–2	0–1
Carrick Rangers	1–6	Glenavon	1–3	0–3
Coleraine	4–2	Bangor	2–0	2–2
Distillery	0–5	Linfield	0–4	0–1
Larne	0–5	Ards	0–3	0–2
Newry Town	2–9	Glentoran	2–2	0–7
Omagh Town	1–2	Cliftonville	0–1	1–1

=== Quarter-finals ===
Team 1	Score	Team 2
Cliftonville]	3–0	Coleraine
Crusaders	1–6	Portadown
Glenavon	1–2	Ards
Glentoran	2–1	Linfield

=== Semi-finals ===
Team 1	Score	Team 2
Cliftonville	3–1	Ards
Glentoran	1–0	Portadown

=== Final ===
19 March 1996

Cliftonville	3–1	Glentoran
McCann 42'; Cross 47'; Stokes 86'		Cook 29'

Windsor Park, Belfast
Referee: Norman Cowie (Bangor)
