= 1991–92 Floodlit Cup =

Tournament details
- Country: Northern Ireland
- Teams: 16

Final positions
- Champions: Omagh Town (1st win)
- Runners-up: Linfield

Tournament statistics
- Matches played: 15
- Goals scored: 59 (3.93 per match)

The 1991–92 Floodlit Cup was the 5th edition of the Floodlit Cup, a cup competition in Northern Irish football.

Omagh Town won the tournament for the 1st time, defeating Linfield 3–1 in the final.

== Results ==
=== First round ===
Team 1	Score	Team 2
Ballymena United	5–2	Crusaders
Carrick Rangers	1–3	Distillery
Cliftonville	1–0	Bangor
Coleraine	0–4	Linfield
Glenavon	2–3	Portadown
Glentoran	4–1	Ballyclare Comrades
Larne	2–3	Omagh Town
Newry Town	2–3 (a.e.t.)	Ards

=== Quarter-finals ===
Team 1	Score	Team 2
Glentoran	4–0	Ards
Linfield	2–0	Distillery
Omagh Town	1–0	Ballymena United
Portadown	1–4	Cliftonville

=== Semi-finals ===
Team 1	Score	Team 2
Linfield	1–1 (a.e.t.) (7–6 p)	Cliftonville
Omagh Town	3–2	Glentoran

=== Final ===
4 December 1991

Omagh Town	3–1	Linfield
McColgan 5'; McCourt 61'; Woodhead 77'		McGaughey 3'; McCormick (red card) 55'

The Oval, Belfast
Referee: A. Ritchie (Belfast)
