= 1997–98 Floodlit Cup =

Tournament details
- Country: Northern Ireland
- Teams: 18

Final positions
- Champions: Linfield (2nd win)
- Runners-up: Cliftonville

Tournament statistics
- Matches played: 17
- Goals scored: 53 (3.12 per match)

The 1997–98 Floodlit Cup was the 11th and final edition of the Floodlit Cup, a cup competition in Northern Irish football.

Linfield won the tournament for the 2nd time, defeating Cliftonville 2–0 in the final.

== Results ==
=== Preliminary round ===
Team 1	Score	Team 2
Ballyclare Comrades	1–2	Distillery
Limavady United	2–2 (a.e.t.) (4–5 p)	Bangor

=== First round ===
Team 1	Score	Team 2
Ards	0–1	Cliftonville
Carrick Rangers	0–7	Glenavon
Distillery	3–0	Portadown
Dungannon Swifts	0–3	Coleraine
Glentoran	1–1 (a.e.t.) (2–3 p)	Newry Town
Larne	2–3	Ballymena United
Linfield	3–0	Bangor
Omagh Town	2–2 (a.e.t.) (6–5 p)	Crusaders

=== Quarter-finals ===
Team 1	Score	Team 2
Ballymena United	1–0	Coleraine
Cliftonville	3–0	Omagh Town
Distillery	0–2	Linfield
Glenavon	3–3 (a.e.t.) (4–2 p)	Newry Town

=== Semi-finals ===
Team 1	Score	Team 2
Cliftonville	2–1	Ballymena United
Linfield	1–0	Glenavon

=== Final ===
28 April 1998

Linfield	2–0	Cliftonville
Larmour 44'; Feeney 87'

Windsor Park, Belfast
Referee: Michael Ross (Carrickfergus)
