= 1995–96 Irish News Cup =

Tournament details
- Country: Northern Ireland; Republic of Ireland
- Teams: 4

Final positions
- Champions: Coleraine (1st title)
- Runners-up: Omagh Town

Tournament statistics
- Matches played: 6
- Goals scored: 25 (4.17 per match)

The 1995–96 Irish News Cup was the inaugural edition of the Irish News Cup, an association football cup competition featuring teams from Northern Ireland and the Republic of Ireland.

Coleraine won the title, defeating Omagh Town 12–2 on aggregate in the two-legged final.

== Results ==
=== Semi-finals ===
Teams that were at home in the first leg listed on the left.

Team 1	Agg.	Team 2	1st leg	2nd leg
Derry City	0–3	Coleraine	0–2	0–1
Omagh Town	6–2	Finn Harps	3–1	3–1

=== Final ===
31 January 1996

Omagh Town	1–4	Coleraine
Kavanagh 57'		McCallan 8', 43', 44'; Gorman 25'

St Julian's Road, Omagh
Referee: Wilfrid Wallace (Donegal)

13 February 1996

Coleraine	8–1	Omagh Town
McAllister 19'; Gorman 30'; O'Dowd 33', 63'; Young 58'; McCallan 70', 75'; Houston 84'		McHugh 54'; McGill (red card) 84'

The Showgrounds, Coleraine
Referee: Leslie Irvine (Limavady)

Coleraine win 12–2 on aggregate.
