= 1973–74 Carlsberg Cup =

Tournament details
- Country: Northern Ireland
- Teams: 12

Final positions
- Champions: Crusaders (1st title)
- Runners-up: Ards

Tournament statistics
- Matches played: 16
- Goals scored: 60 (3.75 per match)

The 1973–74 Carlsberg Cup was the 2nd and final edition of the Carlsberg Cup, a cup competition in Northern Irish football.

The tournament was won by Crusaders, defeating Ards 3–0 in the final at Windsor Park.

== Results ==
=== First round ===
Team 1	Score	Team 2
Ards	5–0	Ballymena United
Bangor	4–5 (a.e.t.)	Portadown
Cliftonville	0–2	Distillery
Dundela	1–5	Crusaders
Glenavon	0–1	Carrick Rangers
Glentoran	1–0	Brantwood
Larne	0–1	Coleraine
Linfield	3–1	Lisburn Rangers

=== Quarter-finals ===
Team 1	Score	Team 2
Ards	4–2	Glentoran
Carrick Rangers	2–5	Portadown
Crusaders	7–0	Distillery
Linfield	1–0	Coleraine

=== Semi-finals ===
Team 1	Score	Team 2
Ards	3–1	Linfield
Crusaders	2–1	Portadown

=== Final ===
15 August 1973

Crusaders	3–0	Ards
McQuillan 12', 64'; Finney 72'	Report

Windsor Park, Belfast
Referee: Jim Lawther (Bangor)
