= 1990–91 Floodlit Cup =

Tournament details
- Country: Northern Ireland
- Teams: 16

Final positions
- Champions: Portadown (1st win)
- Runners-up: Glenavon

Tournament statistics
- Matches played: 15
- Goals scored: 40 (2.67 per match)

The 1990–91 Floodlit Cup was the 4th edition of the Floodlit Cup, a cup competition in Northern Irish football.

Portadown won the tournament for the 1st time, defeating Glenavon 2–0 in the final.

== Results ==
=== First round ===
Team 1	Score	Team 2
Ballymena United	2–1	Distillery
Bangor	2–1	Glentoran
Glenavon	2–0	Coleraine
Larne	1–1 (a.e.t.) (2–3 p)	Crusaders
Linfield	2–0	Ballyclare Comrades
Newry Town	2–1	Carrick Rangers
Omagh Town	2–2 (a.e.t.) (4–3 p)	Cliftonville
Portadown	4–2	Ards

=== Quarter-finals ===
Team 1	Score	Team 2
Ballymena United	0–0 (a.e.t.) (5–4 p)	Bangor
Crusaders	1–2	Portadown
Linfield	0–1	Omagh Town
Newry Town	0–4	Glenavon

=== Semi-finals ===
Team 1	Score	Team 2
Glenavon	3–0	Omagh Town
Portadown	2–2 (a.e.t.) (5–3 p)	Ballymena United

=== Final ===
11 December 1990

Portadown	2–0	Glenavon
Davidson 2'; Cowan 30'

Windsor Park, Belfast
Referee: David Magill (Belfast)
