= 1987–88 Floodlit Cup =

Tournament details
- Country: Northern Ireland
- Teams: 14

Final positions
- Champions: Glentoran (1st win)
- Runners-up: Coleraine

Tournament statistics
- Matches played: 13
- Goals scored: 32 (2.46 per match)

The 1987–88 Floodlit Cup was the inaugural edition of the Floodlit Cup, a cup competition in Northern Irish football.

Glentoran won the tournament for the 1st time, defeating Coleraine 1–0 in the final.

== Results ==
=== First round ===
Team 1	Score	Team 2
Bangor	1–0	Ards
Cliftonville	0–2	Glentoran
Crusaders	3–1	Carrick Rangers
Distillery	0–1	Linfield
Larne	1–3	Glenavon
Newry Town	1–1 (a.e.t.) (6–7 p)	Ballymena United
Coleraine	bye	
Portadown	bye	

=== Quarter-finals ===
Team 1	Score	Team 2
Bangor	2–0	Ballymena United
Coleraine	1–0 (a.e.t.)	Linfield
Glenavon	6–0	Crusaders
Glentoran	2–0	Portadown

=== Semi-finals ===
Team 1	Score	Team 2
Coleraine	2–2 (a.e.t.) (3–1 p)	Bangor
Glentoran	2–0	Glenavon

=== Final ===
15 December 1987

Glentoran	1–0	Coleraine
Morrison 44'

Windsor Park, Belfast
Referee: Alan Snoddy (Carryduff)
