= 1990–91 Irish Cup =

Tournament details
- Country: Northern Ireland
- Teams: 94

Final positions
- Champions: Portadown (1st win)
- Runners-up: Glenavon

Tournament statistics
- Matches played: 109
- Goals scored: 393 (3.61 per match)

The 1990–91 Irish Cup was the 111th edition of the Irish Cup, Northern Ireland's premier football knock-out cup competition. It concluded on 4 May 1991 with the final.

Glentoran were the defending champions after winning their 15th Irish Cup last season, defeating Portadown 3–0 in the 1990 final. This season Portadown went one better by winning their first Irish cup in their fifth appearance in the final. They defeated Glenavon 2–1 in the final.

== Results ==
=== First round ===
The following teams were given byes into the second round: Ards Rangers, Armagh City, Ballymoney United, Crumlin United, Kilmore Rec., Limavady United, Magherafelt Sky Blues, Nitos Athletic, Portglenone, Rathfriland Rangers, Saintfield United, Sirocco Works and Star of the Sea.

Team 1	Score	Team 2
Armagh Thistle	1–0	Roe Valley
Armoy United	3–0	Portstewart
Ballynahinch United	1–4	East Belfast
Barn United	1–1	Cromac Albion
British Telecom	3–2	Hanover
Dervock United	4–4	Connor
Downshire Young Men	0–2	Cullybackey
Dromara Village	1–4	Annalong Swifts
Dundela	2–0	Harland & Wolff Sports
FC Enkalon	3–0	Civil Service
Fisher Body	0–3	STC
GEC	1–2	Comber Rec.
Glebe Rangers	3–2	Dromore Amateurs
Harland & Wolff Welders	6–1	Institute
Islandmagee	0–2	AFC
Killyleagh Youth	4–2	Drumaness Mills
Larne Tech Old Boys	2–2	Moyola Park
Loughgall	3–1	Donard Hospital
Macosquin	6–3	1st Liverpool
Mosside United	2–4	Bangor Amateurs
Newtownabbey Town	1–0	UUJ
Orangefield Old Boys	3–2	Armagh United
Queen's University	1–1	1st Bangor Old Boys
RUC	2–1	Oxford United Stars
Shorts	2–0	Bridgend United
Tandragee Rovers	5–2	Magherafelt Youth
UUC	1–2	Killymoon Rangers

==== Replays ====
Team 1	Score	Team 2
1st Bangor Old Boys	0–1	Queen's University
Connor	5–2	Dervock United
Cromac Albion	3–0	Barn United
Moyola Park	3–3 (a.e.t.) (4–3 p)	Larne Tech Old Boys

=== Second round ===
Team 1	Score	Team 2
Annalong Swifts	3–2	Ballymoney United
Ards Rangers	5–4	Magherafelt Sky Blues
Armagh City	2–1	Rathfriland Rangers
Armagh Thistle	2–0	Nitos Athletic
Bangor Amateurs	3–0	Newtownabbey Town
Connor	0–0	Cromac Albion
Crumlin United	0–1	Comber Rec.
Cullybackey	1–1	Glebe Rangers
Dundela	5–1	Kilmore Rec.
East Belfast	3–1	Limavady United
Killyleagh Youth	1–3	Harland & Wolff Welders
Larne Tech Old Boys	0–1	British Telecom
Loughgall	3–1	AFC
Orangefield Old Boys	5–1	Armoy United
Portglenone	1–3	Shorts
Queen's University	1–0	Killymoon Rangers
Saintfield United	0–0	Macosquin
Sirocco Works	5–1	Star of the Sea
STC	1–1	RUC
Tandragee Rovers	2–4	FC Enkalon

==== Replays ====
Team 1	Score	Team 2
Cromac Albion	2–3	Connor
Glebe Rangers	3–1	Cullybackey
Macosquin	2–2 (a.e.t.) (6–4 p)	Saintfield United
RUC	1–0	STC

=== Third round ===
Team 1	Score	Team 2
Annalong Swifts	1–0	Queen's University
Armagh Thistle	0–2	Loughgall
Bangor Amateurs	4–2	Saintfield United
British Telecom	2–1	Connor
Comber Rec.	5–1	Ards Rangers
Harland & Wolff Welders	5–3	Glebe Rangers
Orangefield Old Boys	0–3	Dundela
RUC	1–2	East Belfast
Shorts	2–0	FC Enkalon
Sirocco Works	1–1	Armagh City

==== Replay ====
Team 1	Score	Team 2
Armagh City	4–0	Sirocco Works

=== Fourth round ===
Team 1	Score	Team 2
Annalong Swifts	1–3	Loughgall
Armagh City	1–2	Shorts
British Telecom	2–2	Dundela
Comber Rec.	0–0	East Belfast
Harland & Wolff Welders	2–1	Bangor Amateurs

==== Replays ====
Team 1	Score	Team 2
Dundela	2–0	British Telecom
East Belfast	4–0	Comber Rec.

=== Fifth round ===
Team 1	Score	Team 2
Ballinamallard United	0–4	Glentoran
Brantwood	0–2	Glenavon
Carrick Rangers	2–1	Shorts
Chimney Corner	1–5	Ballyclare Comrades
Cliftonville	2–1	Dundela
Coleraine	3–1	Banbridge Town
Cookstown United	0–1	Donegal Celtic
Crewe United	0–3	Coagh United
Distillery	0–1	Crusaders
Dungannon Swifts	1–3	Ards
Dunmurry Recreation	1–3	Bangor
Larne	4–1	East Belfast
Linfield	1–1	Harland & Wolff Welders
Omagh Town	3–2	Ballymena United
Portadown	0–0	Newry Town
Tobermore United	2–1	Loughgall

==== Replays ====
Team 1	Score	Team 2
Harland & Wolff Welders	1–4	Linfield
Newry Town	0–2	Portadown

=== Sixth round ===
Team 1	Score	Team 2
Ards	0–0	Donegal Celtic
Carrick Rangers	1–3	Larne
Cliftonville	0–0	Crusaders
Coagh United	0–7	Ballyclare Comrades
Glenavon	2–0	Bangor
Glentoran	9–1	Tobermore United
Linfield	2–0	Coleraine
Portadown	3–1	Omagh Town

==== Replays ====
Team 1	Score	Team 2
Crusaders	3–2	Cliftonville
Donegal Celtic	0–2	Ards

=== Quarter-finals ===
Team 1	Score	Team 2
Ards	3–2	Linfield
Crusaders	2–4	Portadown
Glenavon	4–0	Ballyclare Comrades
Larne	1–1	Glentoran

==== Replay ====
Team 1	Score	Team 2
Glentoran	4–1	Larne

=== Semi-finals ===
Team 1	Score	Team 2
Ards	1–2	Portadown
Glenavon	3–1	Glentoran

=== Final ===
4 May 1991

Portadown	2 – 1	Glenavon
Cowan 6', 44'	Report	Ferguson 46'

Windsor Park, Belfast
