= 1991–92 Irish League =

Irish League
- Season: 1991–92
- Champions: Glentoran; 19th Irish title
- Matches played: 240
- Goals scored: 724 (3.02 per match)
- Top goalscorer: Harry McCourt; Stephen McBride (18 goals each)

Location of teams in the Irish League from 1990–95
Location of Belfast-based teams in the Irish League from 1990–95

The 1991–92 Irish League was the 91st edition of the Irish League, the highest level of league competition in Northern Irish football. The league consisted of 16 teams, and Glentoran won the championship.

== League standings ==
Pos	Team	Pld	W	D	L	GF	GA	GD	Pts	Qualification
1	Glentoran (C)	30	24	5	1	78	26	+52	77	Qualification for the Champions League first round
2	Portadown	30	21	2	7	59	19	+40	65	Qualification for the UEFA Cup first round
3	Linfield	30	17	9	4	58	23	+35	60	
4	Larne	30	16	7	7	54	31	+23	55	
5	Glenavon	30	16	4	10	54	36	+18	52	Qualification for the European Cup Winners' Cup first round
6	Crusaders	30	14	5	11	55	37	+18	47	
7	Ards	30	10	11	9	50	46	+4	41	
8	Omagh Town	30	10	6	14	52	58	−6	36	
9	Bangor	30	11	6	13	45	52	−7	36 (Note: 3 points deducted)	
10	Ballymena United	30	8	11	11	37	50	−13	35	
11	Ballyclare Comrades	30	8	8	14	37	64	−27	32	
12	Cliftonville	30	7	10	13	27	34	−7	31	
13	Coleraine	30	7	8	15	35	57	−22	29	
14	Newry Town	30	8	5	17	28	57	−29	29	
15	Distillery	30	5	7	18	31	56	−25	22	
16	Carrick Rangers	30	2	8	20	24	78	−54	14	

Source: rsssf.com
(C) Champions

== Results ==
Home \ Away	ARD	BAN	BLC	BLM	CRK	CLI	COL	CRU	DIS	GLV	GLT	LRN	LIN	NEW	OMA	POR
Ards		1–4	0–0	6–1	1–0	3–0	0–1	1–1	4–4	2–3	1–1	1–1	2–2	2–2	2–0	2–1
Bangor	1–4		2–2	2–0	3–0	0–0	0–2	1–1	4–2	1–0	1–2	0–4	0–2	5–1	1–3	0–2
Ballyclare Comrades	2–1	1–5		2–5	2–2	1–1	4–3	2–1	2–1	1–8	0–2	0–5	0–0	6–1	2–2	1–0
Ballymena United	1–2	2–2	2–0		3–3	1–1	1–1	1–3	0–0	1–2	2–1	1–1	2–2	0–2	1–1	0–6
Carrick Rangers	1–1	1–1	0–1	1–1		0–3	2–2	1–3	0–3	1–3	0–3	0–3	0–1	1–1	1–2	1–4
Cliftonville	0–0	2–0	1–2	0–0	2–0		1–1	2–2	0–1	1–2	0–0	1–1	0–1	1–0	1–2	0–0
Coleraine	1–4	3–0	1–0	0–1	0–2	2–0		0–2	2–0	2–2	1–4	0–0	1–3	0–1	1–1	0–2
Crusaders	2–1	0–1	2–0	1–2	6–0	5–1	5–1		0–1	3–1	2–3	2–1	0–2	2–0	3–3	0–2
Distillery	1–1	0–1	1–1	0–0	2–2	2–0	1–2	1–3		1–2	0–2	1–2	0–4	1–2	2–1	1–3
Glenavon	3–0	0–0	2–1	2–0	2–0	0–2	3–0	2–1	4–0		0–2	0–1	2–1	0–0	4–0	1–2
Glentoran	1–1	3–1	4–2	4–0	7–0	1–0	6–1	1–0	3–0	5–1		2–0	3–3	2–1	4–2	1–0
Larne	1–0	3–1	4–1	3–1	5–0	1–0	2–2	0–1	2–2	3–2	2–3		2–1	1–0	3–0	0–4
Linfield	5–2	5–1	0–0	1–0	4–0	1–0	2–0	0–1	3–2	1–1	0–0	0–0		3–0	2–1	1–2
Newry Town	1–2	4–3	2–1	1–4	0–3	1–5	2–2	1–0	2–1	0–2	1–2	1–0	0–1		0–2	0–1
Omagh Town	3–0	2–3	3–0	0–2	6–2	1–2	4–3	2–2	3–0	1–0	3–4	1–2	1–7	1–1		0–1
Portadown	2–3	0–1	3–0	0–2	3–0	3–0	2–0	3–1	1–0	3–0	1–2	3–1	0–0	3–0	2–1	

Source: Irish League Archive
Legend: Blue = home team win; Yellow = draw; Red = away team win.
