= 1994–95 Irish League =

Irish League
- Season: 1994–95
- Champions: Crusaders; 3rd Irish title
- Relegated: Coleraine; Omagh Town; Distillery; Ballymena United; Carrick Rangers; Ballyclare Comrades; Newry Town; Larne
- Matches played: 240
- Goals scored: 753 (3.14 per match)
- Top goalscorer: Glenn Ferguson (27 goals)

Location of teams in the Irish League from 1990–95
Location of Belfast-based teams in the Irish League from 1990–95

The 1994–95 Irish League was the 94th edition of the Irish League, the highest level of league competition in Northern Irish football. The league consisted of 16 teams, and Crusaders won the championship.

== League standings ==
Pos	Team	Pld	W	D	L	GF	GA	GD	Pts	Qualification or Relegation
1	Crusaders (C)	30	20	7	3	58	25	+33	67	Qualification for the UEFA Cup qualifying round
2	Glenavon	30	18	6	6	76	40	+36	60	Qualification for the UEFA Cup qualifying round
3	Portadown	30	15	5	10	59	41	+18	50	
4	Ards	30	15	5	10	55	42	+13	50	
5	Glentoran	30	14	8	8	53	41	+12	50	
6	Cliftonville	30	13	11	6	44	32	+12	50	
7	Coleraine (R)	30	12	13	5	52	39	+13	49	Relegation to the First Division
8	Linfield	30	11	11	8	48	34	+14	44	Qualification for the Cup Winners' Cup qualifying round
9	Omagh Town (R)	30	10	12	8	42	38	+4	42	Relegation to the First Division
10	Distillery (R)	30	12	6	12	45	47	−2	42	Relegation to the First Division
11	Bangor	30	8	14	8	42	38	+4	38	
12	Ballymena United (R)	30	7	8	15	43	53	−10	29	Relegation to the First Division
13	Carrick Rangers (R)	30	6	7	17	43	77	−34	25	Relegation to the First Division
14	Ballyclare Comrades (R)	30	6	6	18	41	63	−22	24	Relegation to the First Division
15	Newry Town (R)	30	4	9	17	34	74	−40	21	Relegation to the First Division
16	Larne (R)	30	3	4	23	18	69	−51	13	Relegation to the First Division

Source: rsssf.com
(C) Champions; (R) Relegated

== Results ==
Home \ Away	ARD	BAN	BLC	BLM	CRK	CLI	COL	CRU	DIS	GLV	GLT	LRN	LIN	NEW	OMA	POR
Ards		2–0	3–0	4–1	2–0	1–2	1–2	0–0	2–1	2–2	2–3	3–1	3–1	4–0	1–1	1–4
Bangor	3–1		2–2	2–3	0–0	0–0	3–3	1–1	2–2	1–0	1–3	1–1	0–0	2–2	2–1	0–2
Ballyclare Comrades	1–4	2–0		1–3	3–0	0–2	1–2	1–2	0–4	0–3	0–4	3–0	2–1	2–3	7–2	0–1
Ballymena United	1–2	0–3	2–2		2–2	0–1	1–1	0–2	2–3	0–1	3–3	0–0	2–1	1–1	0–2	3–2
Carrick Rangers	4–1	0–3	2–1	2–1		2–1	2–2	2–6	1–3	0–5	2–3	1–2	0–1	2–0	0–4	1–2
Cliftonville	1–0	1–1	2–2	1–0	6–1		0–0	2–2	0–3	3–1	1–0	2–0	1–2	2–2	0–1	1–2
Coleraine	2–2	3–3	1–1	0–0	3–3	1–2		0–1	0–1	2–1	1–0	4–0	2–1	3–0	1–1	3–1
Crusaders	1–2	1–0	3–0	2–1	1–0	1–0	3–3		2–1	1–3	1–2	4–1	1–0	4–0	1–1	2–1
Distillery	0–3	1–2	2–0	2–1	2–1	1–1	0–2	0–3		1–3	3–2	2–4	1–1	2–2	1–1	1–4
Glenavon	3–0	2–2	4–2	3–1	4–4	2–2	1–4	0–0	3–0		3–1	5–1	4–0	4–0	1–1	1–0
Glentoran	4–1	1–0	3–1	2–0	2–2	2–3	1–1	0–2	1–0	1–3		3–1	2–2	2–1	0–0	1–6
Larne	0–1	0–1	0–0	2–3	1–2	1–2	0–2	1–3	0–1	0–5	0–4		0–4	1–1	0–2	0–1
Linfield	1–1	0–5	2–1	3–0	1–1	0–0	1–2	1–1	0–0	4–0	1–1	6–0		2–0	1–1	2–2
Newry Town	1–3	1–1	1–3	0–8	6–1	1–1	4–1	2–5	0–3	2–3	0–0	1–0	0–4		0–2	1–1
Omagh Town	1–3	0–0	4–2	1–2	4–1	0–0	1–1	0–1	2–3	3–2	0–0	2–0	0–3	3–2		1–1
Portadown	1–0	3–1	1–1	2–2	5–4	3–4	3–0	0–1	2–1	2–4	0–2	0–1	1–2	4–0	2–0	

Source: Irish League Archive
Legend: Blue = home team win; Yellow = draw; Red = away team win.
