= 1998–99 Irish News Cup =

Tournament details
- Country: Northern Ireland; Republic of Ireland
- Teams: 12

Final positions
- Champions: Finn Harps (1st title)
- Runners-up: Ballymena United

Tournament statistics
- Matches played: 11
- Goals scored: 34 (3.09 per match)

The 1998–99 Irish News Cup was the 4th and final edition of the Irish News Cup, an association football cup competition featuring teams from Northern Ireland and the Republic of Ireland.

Finn Harps won the title, defeating Ballymena United 2–0 in the final.

== Results ==
=== First round ===
Team 1	Score	Team 2
Institute	1–0	Cliftonville
Limavady United	2–1	Fanad United
Omagh Town	1–1 (4–2 p)	Monaghan United
Sligo Rovers	3–2	Ballinamallard United
Ballymena United	bye	
Coleraine	bye	
Derry City	bye	
Finn Harps	bye	

=== Quarter-finals ===
Team 1	Score	Team 2
Derry City	4–0	Limavady United
Finn Harps	1–1 (3–2 p)	Coleraine
Institute	1–2	Ballymena United
Omagh Town	2–5 (a.e.t.)^{1}	Sligo Rovers

^{1}Sligo were disqualified from the tournament for fielding ineligible players and Omagh advanced to the next round.

=== Semi-finals ===
Team 1	Score	Team 2
Ballymena United	2–1	Omagh Town
Derry City	0–2	Finn Harps

=== Final ===
29 April 1999

Finn Harps	2–0	Ballymena United
McGrenaghan 41'; Harkin 55'	Report

Finn Park, Ballybofey
Referee: George McKay (Strabane)
