= 1997–98 Irish News Cup =

Tournament details
- Country: Northern Ireland; Republic of Ireland
- Teams: 7

Final positions
- Champions: Omagh Town (1st title)
- Runners-up: Ballymena United

Tournament statistics
- Matches played: 9
- Goals scored: 32 (3.56 per match)

The 1997–98 Irish News Cup was the 3rd edition of the Irish News Cup, an association football cup competition featuring teams from Northern Ireland and the Republic of Ireland.

Omagh Town won the title, defeating Ballymena United 2–1 on aggregate in the two-legged final.

== Results ==
=== Quarter-finals ===
Team 1	Score	Team 2
Ballymena United	2–0	Limavady United
Dundalk	2–4 (a.e.t.)	Omagh Town
Finn Harps	2–0	Derry City
Coleraine	bye	

=== Semi-finals ===
Teams that were at home in the first leg listed on the left.

Team 1	Agg.	Team 2	1st leg	2nd leg
Coleraine	2–11	Ballymena United	2–5	0–6
Omagh Town	5–1	Finn Harps	3–0	2–1

=== Final ===
12 March 1998

Omagh Town	1–1	Ballymena United
McHugh 59'		Loughery 54'

St Julian's Road, Omagh

2 April 1998

Ballymena United	0–1	Omagh Town
		Wilson 25'

The Showgrounds, Ballymena

Omagh Town win 2–1 on aggregate.
