= 1992–93 Floodlit Cup =

Tournament details
- Country: Northern Ireland
- Teams: 16

Final positions
- Champions: Portadown (2nd win)
- Runners-up: Ballymena United

Tournament statistics
- Matches played: 15
- Goals scored: 56 (3.73 per match)

The 1992–93 Floodlit Cup was the 6th edition of the Floodlit Cup, a cup competition in Northern Irish football.

Portadown won the tournament for the 2nd time, defeating Ballymena United 3–1 in the final.

== Results ==
=== First round ===
Team 1	Score	Team 2
Ballyclare Comrades	0–2	Cliftonville
Ballymena United	2–0	Omagh Town
Bangor	0–1	Portadown
Carrick Rangers	1–0 (a.e.t.)	Coleraine
Crusaders	2–1	Glenavon
Glentoran	2–3 (a.e.t.)	Distillery
Linfield	3–0	Larne
Newry Town	2–3	Ards

=== Quarter-finals ===
Team 1	Score	Team 2
Cliftonville	1–2	Ards
Crusaders	2–3 (a.e.t.)	Ballymena United
Distillery	4–3 (a.e.t.)	Carrick Rangers
Portadown	7–2	Linfield

=== Semi-finals ===
Team 1	Score	Team 2
Ballymena United	0–0 (a.e.t.) (4–2 p)	Distillery
Portadown	4–2	Ards

=== Final ===
15 December 1992

Portadown	3–1	Ballymena United
Russell 36'; Fraser 47', 90'		Candlish 57'

Windsor Park, Belfast
Referee: David Magill (Belfast)
