= 1994–95 Floodlit Cup =

Tournament details
- Country: Northern Ireland
- Teams: 16

Final positions
- Champions: Portadown (3rd win)
- Runners-up: Distillery

Tournament statistics
- Matches played: 15
- Goals scored: 42 (2.8 per match)

The 1994–95 Floodlit Cup was the 8th edition of the Floodlit Cup, a cup competition in Northern Irish football.

Portadown won the tournament for the 3rd time, defeating Distillery 4–2 in the final.

== Results ==
=== First round ===
| Team 1 | Score | Team 2 |
|---|---|---|
| Ards | 1–2 | Bangor |
| Ballymena United | 0–1 | Ballyclare Comrades |
| Crusaders | 0–0 (a.e.t.) (2–4 p) | Newry Town |
| Glenavon | 1–2 | Cliftonville |
| Glentoran | 2–3 | Distillery |
| Larne | 1–2 | Coleraine |
| Omagh Town | 0–2 | Linfield |
| Portadown | 3–1 | Carrick Rangers |

=== Quarter-finals ===
| Team 1 | Score | Team 2 |
|---|---|---|
| Ballyclare Comrades] | 1–0 | Newry Town |
| Bangor | 3–2 | Coleraine |
| Linfield | 1–2 | Distillery |
| Portadown | 1–0 | Cliftonville |

=== Semi-finals ===
| Team 1 | Score | Team 2 |
|---|---|---|
| Distillery | 1–0 | Ballyclare Comrades |
| Portadown | 3–1 | Bangor |

=== Final ===
6 December 1994

| Portadown | 4–2 | Distillery |
|---|---|---|
| Strain 77'; Cunningham 80'; Russell 83'; Doolin 85' | | Totten 27'; Dykes 75' |

Mourneview Park, Lurgan
Referee: Leslie Irvine (Limavady)
