= 1996–97 Irish News Cup =

Tournament details
- Country: Northern Ireland; Republic of Ireland
- Teams: 8

Final positions
- Champions: Derry City (1st title)
- Runners-up: Sligo Rovers

Tournament statistics
- Matches played: 14
- Goals scored: 49 (3.5 per match)

The 1996–97 Irish News Cup was the 2nd edition of the Irish News Cup, an association football cup competition featuring teams from Northern Ireland and the Republic of Ireland.

Derry City won the title, defeating Sligo Rovers 5–4 on aggregate in the two-legged final.

== Results ==
=== Quarter-finals ===
Teams that were at home in the first leg listed on the left.

Team 1	Agg.	Team 2	1st leg	2nd leg
Finn Harps	4–2	Coleraine	2–0	2–2
Limavady United	1–4	Dundalk	1–1	0–3
Omagh Town	2–3	Derry City	0–3	2–0
Sligo Rovers	5–2	Ballymena United	1–0	4–2

=== Semi-finals ===
Teams that were at home in the first leg listed on the left.

Team 1	Agg.	Team 2	1st leg	2nd leg
Dundalk	2–9	Derry City	1–4	1–5
Sligo Rovers	5–1	Finn Harps	2–1	3–0

=== Final ===
26 March 1997

Sligo Rovers	3–0	Derry City
Thew 32', 80', 83'

The Showgrounds, Sligo
Referee: John Ferry (Derry)

8 April 1997

Derry City	5–1	Sligo Rovers
Kelly 32'; Hargan 71', 79'; McCabe 83'; Hegarty 87'		Oates 15'

Brandywell Stadium, Derry
Referee: Tony Gilroy (Donegal)

Derry City win 5–4 on aggregate.
