= 1974–75 Texaco (All-Ireland) Cup =

Tournament details
- Country: Northern Ireland; Republic of Ireland
- Teams: 4

Final positions
- Champions: Waterford (1st title)
- Runners-up: Linfield

Tournament statistics
- Matches played: 6
- Goals scored: 17 (2.83 per match)

The 1974–75 Texaco (All-Ireland) Cup was the 2nd and final edition of the Texaco (All-Ireland) Cup, an association football cup competition featuring teams from Northern Ireland and the Republic of Ireland.

Portadown won the title, defeating Bohemians 5–3 on aggregate in the two-legged final.

== Results ==
=== Semi-finals ===
Teams that were at home in the first leg listed on the left.

Team 1	Agg.	Team 2	1st leg	2nd leg
Cork Hibernians	2–4	Linfield	0–2	2–2
Crusaders	4–6	Waterford	3–3	1–3

=== Final ===
7 November 1974

Waterford	1–0	Linfield
F. O'Neill 69'	Report

Kilcohan Park, Waterford
Referee: D. V. Byrne (Dublin)

18 December 1974

Linfield	0–0	Waterford
	Report

Windsor Park, Belfast
Attendance: 3,500
Referee: S. E. Patterson (Belfast)

Waterford win 1–0 on aggregate.
