= Nedas Maciulaitis =

Northern Irish footballer (born 1999)

Personal information
- Full name: Nedas Maciulaitis
- Date of birth: 6 August 1999 (age 27)
- Place of birth: Ukmergė, Lithuania
- Position: Forward

Team information
- Current team: Carrick Rangers

Youth career
- ?-2015: Portadown

Senior career*
Years	Team	Apps	(Gls)
2015–2017	Portadown	4	(0)
2017-2018	Dundalk	0	(0)
2018-2019	Armagh City		
2019–2020	Coleraine	12	(1)
2020	→ Annagh United (loan)		
2020-2023	Loughgall	54	(24)
2023–	Carrick Rangers	100	(14)
- * Club domestic league appearances and goals as of 22 February 2026

Nedas Maciulaitis is a football player for Carrick Rangers FC in Northern Ireland.

== Early life ==
Maciulaitis moved from Lithuania to Northern Ireland with his family at the age of five.

== Club career ==
In 2020, Maciulaitis signed for Northern Irish side Loughgall, where he was regarded as one of the club's most important players. In 2023, he signed for Northern Irish side Carrick Rangers, where he formed an attack partnership with Northern Irish footballer Emmett McGuckin.

== International career ==
Maciulaitis has represented Northern Ireland internationally at youth level.

== Style of play ==
Maciulaitis mainly operates as a striker and is known for his speed.
