= Irish News Cup =

- Founded: 1995
- Abolished: 1999
- Region: Northern Ireland; Republic of Ireland
- Most championships: Coleraine; Derry City; Omagh Town; Finn Harps (1 title each)

The Irish News Cup was a "north-south" association football competition in Ireland involving teams from the Irish League and League of Ireland, mostly located in the north-west of the island. It is thus not counted among the major all-Ireland cup tournaments, since neither League champions nor Cup winners were involved. (Derry City did win the League of Ireland title in 1996-97). It was sponsored by The Irish News (a nationalist newspaper based in Belfast) and also referred to as the Irish News North West Cup. It lasted four seasons.

== List of finals ==
Season	Winner (number of titles)	Score	Runner-up	Venue
1995–96	(Northern Ireland) Coleraine (1)	4 – 1	(Northern Ireland) Omagh Town	St Julian's Road, Omagh
1995–96	(Northern Ireland) Coleraine (1)	8 – 1 (12 – 2 agg.)	(Northern Ireland) Omagh Town	The Showgrounds, Coleraine
1996–97	(Republic of Ireland) Derry City (1)	0 – 3	(Republic of Ireland) Sligo Rovers	The Showgrounds, Sligo
1996–97	(Republic of Ireland) Derry City (1)	5 – 1 (5 – 4 agg.)	(Republic of Ireland) Sligo Rovers	Brandywell Stadium, Derry
1997–98	(Northern Ireland) Omagh Town (1)	1 – 1	(Northern Ireland) Ballymena United	St Julian's Road, Omagh
1997–98	(Northern Ireland) Omagh Town (1)	1 – 0 (2 – 1 agg.)	(Northern Ireland) Ballymena United	The Showgrounds, Ballymena
1998–99	(Republic of Ireland) Finn Harps (1)	2 – 0	(Northern Ireland) Ballymena United	Finn Park, Ballybofey

== Sources ==
- M. Brodie (ed.), Northern Ireland Soccer Yearbook 1996/97
- M. Brodie (ed.), Northern Ireland Soccer Yearbook 1997/98
- M. Brodie (ed.), Northern Ireland Soccer Yearbook 1998/99
- M. Brodie (ed.), Northern Ireland Soccer Yearbook 1999/2000
- Ballymena United Football Club
