= 1990–91 Irish League =

Irish League
- Season: 1990–91
- Champions: Portadown; 2nd Irish title
- Matches: 240
- Goals: 748 (3.12 per match)
- Top goalscorer: Stephen McBride (22 goals)

Location of teams in the Irish League from 1990–95
Location of Belfast-based teams in the Irish League from 1990–95

The 1990–91 Irish League was the 90th edition of the Irish League, the highest level of football in Northern Ireland. The league began with the first round of matches on 22 September 1990 and ended with the final round of matches on 27 April 1991. Defending champions Portadown won the championship for the second time.

The league consisted of 16 teams, an increase of two from the previous season as Ballyclare Comrades and Omagh Town were elected to the league.

Portadown qualified to compete in the 1991–92 European Cup and runners-up Bangor qualified for the 1991–92 UEFA Cup.

== Background ==
The Irish League was formed in 1890 and was originally a league for the whole of the island of Ireland. From 1920, the competition has been contested by teams from Northern Ireland.

Linfield were the most successful team in the history of the competition having won the league 45 times. Portadown were the defending champions after winning the league for the first time in 1989–90, beating Glenavon to the title by a single point.

The league was increased in size from 14 teams in 1989–90 to 16 teams. No teams were relegated and Ballyclare Comrades and Omagh Town were elected to the league.

== Format ==
The league took on a traditional double round robin format. Each team played every other team twice – once at home and once away from home – for a total of 30 matches each. Three points were awarded for a win, one point was awarded for a draw and nothing was awarded for a loss. Teams were ranked on total number of points accumulated with ties broken by goal difference.

== League standings ==
Pos	Team	Pld	W	D	L	GF	GA	GD	Pts	Qualification
1	Portadown (C)	30	22	5	3	61	22	+39	71	Qualification for the European Cup first round
2	Bangor	30	19	4	7	52	29	+23	61	Qualification for the UEFA Cup first round
3	Glentoran	30	18	6	6	50	32	+18	60	
4	Glenavon	30	17	6	7	63	38	+25	57	Qualification for the European Cup Winners' Cup first round
5	Newry Town	30	15	5	10	50	42	+8	50	
6	Cliftonville	30	14	7	9	59	41	+18	49	
7	Linfield	30	12	10	8	40	34	+6	46	
8	Ballymena United	30	12	8	10	49	46	+3	44	
9	Ards	30	12	7	11	47	40	+7	43	
10	Crusaders	30	11	9	10	53	46	+7	42	
11	Distillery	30	10	5	15	47	57	−10	35	
12	Omagh Town	30	10	4	16	48	66	−18	34	
13	Larne	30	8	6	16	41	59	−18	30	
14	Ballyclare Comrades	30	5	6	19	33	68	−35	21	
15	Carrick Rangers	30	4	5	21	30	58	−28	17	
16	Coleraine	30	2	5	23	25	70	−45	11	

(C) Champions

== Results ==
Home \ Away	ARD	BAN	BLC	BLM	CRK	CLI	COL	CRU	DIS	GLV	GLT	LRN	LIN	NEW	OMA	POR
Ards		0–2	4–3	0–0	2–0	1–1	1–0	0–0	2–1	1–2	2–3	4–1	1–1	1–2	5–1	1–2
Bangor	1–1		3–0	2–2	2–1	4–2	3–1	2–1	2–1	1–2	1–0	2–0	1–0	2–0	3–0	0–1
Ballyclare Comrades	1–0	0–2		1–5	1–0	1–3	1–1	2–3	2–0	3–3	0–1	3–3	1–1	0–2	0–3	0–3
Ballymena United	4–1	3–0	1–1		2–1	1–1	4–0	1–0	1–2	4–3	2–3	4–4	2–2	2–1	2–0	0–2
Carrick Rangers	2–5	1–3	1–2	2–1		1–3	1–0	2–2	0–2	1–2	2–3	1–1	1–2	0–0	0–3	1–4
Cliftonville	2–0	2–0	4–0	1–3	0–2		2–0	3–1	2–1	0–2	2–1	4–0	2–2	6–0	3–2	1–2
Coleraine	0–1	0–4	2–1	0–1	1–1	2–2		1–1	3–4	1–1	1–2	1–0	0–2	2–4	1–4	1–3
Crusaders	0–2	3–2	1–2	0–0	3–3	1–1	4–1		4–1	1–3	2–0	5–0	2–2	2–1	4–1	2–3
Distillery	2–2	1–3	4–1	2–0	2–1	2–2	2–0	1–3		3–2	2–3	1–3	2–1	1–3	0–1	0–0
Glenavon	1–2	2–3	4–0	3–1	2–0	1–2	5–3	2–2	2–1		1–1	2–0	2–1	1–1	3–0	2–1
Glentoran	1–1	0–1	2–1	2–0	2–1	3–2	4–0	2–0	3–1	2–0		1–0	1–0	2–2	4–1	1–1
Larne	0–2	0–1	1–1	1–2	1–0	4–1	2–0	2–2	0–4	0–4	0–1		0–1	4–1	3–3	1–3
Linfield	1–0	2–1	3–1	3–0	1–0	0–4	2–1	2–0	2–2	0–0	1–1	4–2		1–2	0–0	0–1
Newry Town	3–1	1–1	3–2	3–0	2–0	0–0	3–1	1–2	3–0	1–0	2–0	1–2	3–1		2–1	1–3
Omagh Town	2–4	0–0	2–1	1–1	3–4	2–1	2–1	0–1	5–1	2–5	3–1	0–5	0–1	2–1		2–5
Portadown	1–0	2–0	3–1	4–0	1–0	2–0	3–0	3–1	1–1	0–1	0–0	0–1	1–1	2–1	4–2	

Legend: Blue = home team win; Yellow = draw; Red = away team win.
