= 1972–73 Carlsberg Cup =

Tournament details
- Country: Northern Ireland
- Teams: 12

Final positions
- Champions: Portadown (1st title)
- Runners-up: Ards

Tournament statistics
- Matches played: 11
- Goals scored: 46 (4.18 per match)

The 1972–73 Carlsberg Cup was the 1st edition of the Carlsberg Cup, a cup competition in Northern Irish football.

The tournament was won by Portadown, defeating Ards 3–0 in the final at Windsor Park.

== Results ==
=== First round ===
Team 1	Score	Team 2
Bangor	3–2	Distillery
Cliftonville	1–3	Ballymena United
Crusaders	1–0	Glenavon
Derry City	2–4	Coleraine
Ards	bye	
Glentoran	bye	
Linfield	bye	
Portadown	bye	

=== Quarter-finals ===
Team 1	Score	Team 2
Ballymena United	0–6	Ards
Glentoran	0–1	Bangor
Linfield	3–2	Crusaders
Portadown	4–1	Coleraine

=== Semi-finals ===
Team 1	Score	Team 2
Ards	4–1	Bangor
Linfield	2–4	Portadown

=== Final ===
16 August 1972

Portadown	3–0	Ards
Fleming 3'; Anderson 20', 90'	Report

Windsor Park, Belfast
Referee: Eric Smyton (Dungannon)
