= 1973–74 Texaco (All-Ireland) Cup =

Tournament details
- Country: Northern Ireland; Republic of Ireland
- Teams: 4

Final positions
- Champions: Portadown (1st title)
- Runners-up: Bohemians

Tournament statistics
- Matches played: 6
- Goals scored: 28 (4.67 per match)

The 1973–74 Texaco (All-Ireland) Cup was the 1st edition of the Texaco (All-Ireland) Cup, an association football cup competition featuring teams from Northern Ireland and the Republic of Ireland. The tournament was a version of the Texaco Cup that featured teams solely from Ireland; teams from both jurisdictions had previously competed in the Texaco Cup but had not participated the previous season due to security concerns.

Portadown won the title, defeating Bohemians 5–3 on aggregate in the two-legged final.

== Results ==
=== Semi-finals ===
Teams that were at home in the first leg listed on the left.

Team 1	Agg.	Team 2	1st leg	2nd leg
Bohemians	8–3	Coleraine	3–1	5–2
Portadown	6–3	Shamrock Rovers	2–2	4–1

=== Final ===
25 October 1973

Portadown	4–1	Bohemians
Fleming 45', 75'; Jackson 77' (o.g.); Morrison 90'	Report	Flanagan 70'

Shamrock Park, Portadown
Attendance: 5,000
Referee: Jack Lorimer (Belfast)

1 January 1974

Bohemians	2–1	Portadown
Flanagan 31'; O'Connor 36'	Report	Morrison 15'

Dalymount Park, Dublin
Referee: D. Barrett (Cork)

Portadown win 5–3 on aggregate.
