= Carlsberg Cup (Northern Ireland) =

Football tournament (1972 to 1974)

- Organiser(s): Irish Football Association
- Founded: 1972
- Abolished: 1973
- Region: Northern Ireland
- Most championships: Crusaders; Portadown (1 title each)

The Carlsberg Cup was a football competition played for two seasons between clubs in the Irish League in 1972-73 and 1973-74. Held at the beginning of each season, it consisted solely of twelve Irish League clubs in the first season, and in the second season it consisted of twelve Irish League Clubs and four B Division teams.

== Final results ==
Season	Date	Winner	Score	Runner-up	Venue
1972–73	16 August 1972	Portadown	3 – 0	Ards	Windsor Park, Belfast
1973–74	15 August 1973	Crusaders	3 – 0	Ards	Windsor Park, Belfast

== Sources ==
- Malcolm Brodie, "100 Years of Irish Football", Blackstaff Press, Belfast (1980)
