= Geoff Ferris =

Northern Ireland football manager

Geoff Ferris is a Northern Ireland former footballer and football manager..

Through Ferris's successful career in Irish League football, he had spells with Carrick Rangers, Coleraine but he is known best for his contribution to Glenavon FC, at his spell there he scored over 200 goals for the club, most famously his hat-trick in the cup final replay in 1989 over Linfied.

Ferris was manager of Tobermore for 4 seasons before leaving to fill the assistant manager's post at Coleraine at the beginning of the 2008/2009 season.
