= 1989–90 Irish League =

Irish League
- Season: 1989–90
- Champions: Portadown; 1st Irish title
- Matches played: 182
- Goals scored: 510 (2.8 per match)
- Top goalscorer: Martin McGaughey (19 goals)

Location of teams in the Irish League from 1983–1990
Location of Belfast-based teams in the Irish League from 1983–1990

The 1989–90 Irish League was the 89th edition of the Irish League, the highest level of league competition in Northern Irish football. The league consisted of 14 teams, and Portadown won the championship.

== League standings ==
Pos	Team	Pld	W	D	L	GF	GA	GD	Pts	Qualification
1	Portadown (C)	26	16	7	3	42	17	+25	55	Qualification for the European Cup first round
2	Glenavon	26	16	6	4	52	26	+26	54	Qualification for the UEFA Cup first round
3	Glentoran	26	12	8	6	43	24	+19	44	Qualification for the European Cup Winners' Cup first round
4	Linfield	26	14	2	10	54	40	+14	44	
5	Ballymena United	26	12	7	7	37	25	+12	43	
6	Bangor	26	11	5	10	26	22	+4	38	
7	Newry Town	26	11	4	11	42	37	+5	37	
8	Cliftonville	26	9	8	9	37	39	−2	35	
9	Larne	26	8	7	11	29	38	−9	31	
10	Carrick Rangers	26	8	6	12	33	36	−3	30	
11	Coleraine	26	8	6	12	36	44	−8	30	
12	Ards	26	5	6	15	25	44	−19	21	
13	Crusaders	26	4	8	14	27	55	−28	20	
14	Distillery	26	4	8	14	27	63	−36	20	

Source: rsssf.com
(C) Champions

== Results ==
Home \ Away	ARD	BAN	BLM	CRK	CLI	COL	CRU	DIS	GLV	GLT	LRN	LIN	NEW	POR
Ards		0–2	0–2	1–1	3–4	0–4	3–1	5–0	0–1	2–1	0–1	1–2	1–5	0–1
Bangor	3–0		0–1	2–0	1–2	0–1	3–0	2–0	0–0	0–0	0–0	1–0	2–0	1–0
Ballymena United	0–0	1–0		3–1	1–2	1–1	0–0	2–1	3–1	1–1	0–0	5–1	1–3	2–3
Carrick Rangers	2–0	1–1	0–1		3–1	4–0	2–0	2–2	2–2	1–1	4–3	0–3	2–0	1–1
Cliftonville	1–2	1–2	1–0	0–2		2–0	2–2	2–2	1–1	0–0	2–2	1–0	3–2	1–3
Coleraine	4–0	3–2	0–2	1–0	1–1		1–2	0–3	0–3	1–1	2–1	1–3	0–2	0–0
Crusaders	0–3	2–0	0–2	3–2	1–1	1–1		3–3	1–2	0–4	1–2	2–3	2–1	1–2
Distillery	2–1	0–0	1–1	1–0	0–3	2–4	2–2		0–5	0–3	2–2	0–7	1–1	0–2
Glenavon	0–0	0–1	2–1	1–0	2–2	2–1	1–1	6–0		2–1	4–1	3–1	2–1	2–0
Glentoran	0–0	1–3	1–0	2–0	1–0	5–3	6–0	2–0	2–3		2–1	3–2	1–0	2–3
Larne	1–0	3–0	1–2	0–2	1–0	2–1	2–2	1–0	0–2	0–0		1–4	0–2	2–0
Linfield	0–0	3–0	1–2	3–1	1–4	4–3	2–0	3–1	1–3	1–3	2–0		4–1	1–1
Newry Town	2–2	2–0	3–3	2–0	3–0	1–3	2–0	2–4	3–1	1–0	2–0	1–2		0–0
Portadown	4–1	1–0	1–0	2–0	3–0	0–0	3–0	2–0	3–1	0–0	2–2	2–0	3–0	

Source: Irish League Archive
Legend: Blue = home team win; Yellow = draw; Red = away team win.
