= Saintfield United F.C. =

Association football club in Northern Ireland

Saintfield United
- Full name: Saintfield United Football Club
- Nickname(s): The Saints
- Founded: 1972
- Ground: Saintfield High School Playing Fields, Saintfield
- Chairman: Andy Bishop
- Manager: (Northern Ireland) Craig Bowman
- League: NAFL Division 1C
- 2021/22: NAFL Division 1C, 9th
- Website: http://www.saintfield-utd.co.uk/

Saintfield United Football Club is a Northern Irish intermediate football club based in Saintfield, County Down, Northern Ireland playing in Division 1C of the Northern Amateur Football League. The club started in the Newcastle & District League before joining the Amateur League junior section in 1986. Intermediate status was attained in 1987.

== Honours ==
=== Intermediate honours ===
- Division 1A Winners: 1
  - 1991

== Squad ==
Note: Flags indicate national team as defined under FIFA eligibility rules; some limited exceptions apply. Players may hold more than one non-FIFA nationality.

No.	Pos.	Nation	Player
—	GK	(Northern Ireland) NIR	Matthew McClurg
—	DF	(Northern Ireland) NIR	Declan Sherrard
—	DF	(Northern Ireland) NIR	Adam Sofley
—	DF	(Northern Ireland) NIR	David Morrow
—	DF	(Northern Ireland) NIR	Craig Bowman
—	DF	(Northern Ireland) NIR	Alan Weir
—	MF	(Republic of Ireland) IRL	Phil King
—	MF	(Northern Ireland) NIR	Ryan Sofley

No.	Pos.	Nation	Player
—	DF	(Northern Ireland) NIR	Oliver Duff
—	MF	(Northern Ireland) NIR	Adam Childs
—	MF	(Northern Ireland) NIR	Justin Rea
—	MF	(Northern Ireland) NIR	Joshua Johnston-Wood
—	MF	(Northern Ireland) NIR	David Sherrard
—	FW	(Northern Ireland) NIR	Stuart Black
—	FW	(Northern Ireland) NIR	Lee Patton
—	FW	(Northern Ireland) NIR	Jonny Brennan
—	FW	(Northern Ireland) NIR	Andy Clarke
—	FW	(Northern Ireland) NIR	Peter Duff
