= Michael McHugh (footballer) =

Irish footballer

Personal information
- Full name: Michael Bernard McHugh
- Date of birth: 3 April 1971 (age 55)
- Place of birth: Letterkenny, Ireland
- Position: Forward

Senior career*
Years	Team	Apps	(Gls)
1989–1994	Bradford City	31	(4)
1994–1995	Scarborough	3	(0)
1995–1998	Omagh Town		
1998–2000	Derry City		
2000–2004	Coleraine		
2004–2005	Newry City		
Total		34+	(4+)
- * Club domestic league appearances and goals

Michael Bernard McHugh (born 3 April 1971) is an Irish former professional footballer who played as a forward.

== Career ==
Born in Letterkenny, McHugh played for Bradford City, Scarborough, Omagh Town, Derry City, Coleraine and Newry City.
