= Fergal Harkin =

Irish association football player

Fergal Harkin is an Irish football administrator and former player who is the Director of Football for Bolton Wanderers. He is from Ballyliffin in Inishowen, County Donegal in Ireland.

Harkin started his amateur football career with his local club Clonmany Shamrocks, who play in the Inishowen Football League. He then signed for Leicester City F.C. while a student at Loughborough University. He was later released and joined Bohemians for the 1998/1999 season, however moved to Finn Harps F.C. later that season. He appeared in that season's FAI Cup final for Finn Harps but was on the losing side to Bray Wanderers. He was Finn Harps player of the year in the 1999/2000 season.

Harkin re-joined Bohemians in June 2001 and won the first major honour when he played his part in Bohemian's league win of 2002/2003. He was voted "player of the year" at Bohemians in both 2005 and 2006. He retired at the end of the 2007 season due to injury.

Harkin has a degree in Physical Education and Sports Science at Loughborough University and a Masters in Business Studies from University College Dublin. After retiring from football, he worked for Nike for 6 years. From 2009 to 2022 he worked for Manchester City Football Club, first a scout and later as "Football Partnerships and Pathways Manager". He was heavily rumoured to be appointed Director of Football at Celtic F.C. in 2021. However, less than a year later, on 17 May 2022, he was appointed by Standard de Liège as their new manager in charge of deploying the sport strategy of the club in the long term. Harkin was the first significant lateral hire of Standard de Liège after the arrival of 777 Partners as new majority shareholder.

On 10 March 2025, it was announced that Harkin had been appointed as the new Sporting Director at English League One side Bolton Wanderers.
