= 1995–96 Irish League =

Irish League Premier Division
- Season: 1995–96
- Champions: Portadown; 3rd Irish title
- Relegated: Bangor
- Matches played: 112
- Goals scored: 325 (2.9 per match)
- Top goalscorer: Gary Haylock (19 goals)

The 1995–96 Irish League was the 95th edition of the Irish League, the highest level of league competition in Northern Irish football. The league consisted of 8 teams, and Portadown won the championship.

A restructuring during the 1995 pre-season also saw a First Division added below the Premier Division, with regular promotion and relegation between the two leagues being established from this season onwards.

== Premier Division ==
Location of teams in the 1995–96 Irish League Premier Division
Location of the Belfast-based teams in the 1995–96 Irish League Premier Division

=== League standings ===
Pos	Team	Pld	W	D	L	GF	GA	GD	Pts	Qualification or Relegation
1	Portadown (C)	28	16	8	4	61	41	+20	56	Qualification for the UEFA Cup preliminary round
2	Crusaders	28	15	7	6	45	32	+13	52	Qualification for the UEFA Cup preliminary round
3	Glentoran	28	13	7	8	56	38	+18	46	Qualification for the Cup Winners' Cup qualifying round
4	Glenavon	28	13	5	10	47	32	+15	44	
5	Linfield	28	11	8	9	35	36	−1	41	
6	Cliftonville	28	6	11	11	28	49	−21	29	Qualification for the Intertoto Cup group stage
7	Ards	28	6	7	15	29	43	−14	25	
8	Bangor (R)	28	3	5	20	24	54	−30	14	Relegation to the First Division

Source: rsssf.com
(C) Champions; (R) Relegated

=== Results ===
==== Matches 1–14 ====
Home \ Away	ARD	BAN	CLI	CRU	GLV	GLT	LIN	POR
Ards		3–0	3–0	0–0	1–1	1–4	2–3	1–1
Bangor	2–1		3–2	1–2	0–1	1–6	1–2	1–3
Cliftonville	0–0	2–1		1–4	2–2	0–0	1–1	0–3
Crusaders	1–2	2–0	1–0		1–2	2–1	3–0	3–1
Glenavon	3–0	1–0	1–2	4–0		2–3	0–3	0–1
Glentoran	3–2	1–1	1–1	3–1	0–2		0–3	1–1
Linfield	0–0	0–0	0–0	1–2	0–3	0–4		1–0
Portadown	3–1	4–2	6–1	1–1	2–1	3–1	3–2	

Source: Irish League Archive
Legend: Blue = home team win; Yellow = draw; Red = away team win.

==== Matches 15–28 ====
Home \ Away	ARD	BAN	CLI	CRU	GLV	GLT	LIN	POR
Ards		2–1	2–2	0–1	1–2	0–2	1–2	0–2
Bangor	0–1		2–3	0–2	1–2	1–1	0–2	0–0
Cliftonville	1–0	1–1		2–1	0–1	1–0	0–0	0–4
Crusaders	2–0	1–0	1–1		1–0	1–3	4–2	3–3
Glenavon	3–1	0–1	1–1	1–1		1–3	2–2	7–0
Glentoran	3–1	3–0	2–1	2–2	1–2		3–0	3–3
Linfield	0–0	2–1	3–1	0–1	2–1	2–0		0–1
Portadown	1–3	4–3	4–1	1–1	2–1	3–2	1–1	

Source: Irish League Archive
Legend: Blue = home team win; Yellow = draw; Red = away team win.

== First Division ==
Irish League First Division
- Season: 1995–96
- Champions: Coleraine
- Promoted: Coleraine
- Matches played: 112
- Goals scored: 327 (2.92 per match)

Location of teams in the 1995–96 Irish League First Division

=== League standings ===
Pos	Team	Pld	W	D	L	GF	GA	GD	Pts	Qualification or Promotion
1	Coleraine (C, P)	28	21	4	3	81	27	+54	67	Promotion to the Premier Division
2	Ballymena United	28	13	10	5	38	25	+13	49	
3	Omagh Town	28	12	7	9	49	42	+7	43	
4	Distillery	28	10	7	11	35	34	+1	37	
5	Ballyclare Comrades	28	10	3	15	29	48	−19	33	
6	Carrick Rangers	28	9	3	16	32	56	−24	30	
7	Larne	28	7	7	14	31	36	−5	28	
8	Newry Town	28	7	5	16	31	58	−27	26	

Source: rsssf.com
(C) Champions; (P) Promoted
