= Texaco (All-Ireland) Cup =

Texaco Cup
- Organising body: Texaco
- Founded: 1973
- Abolished: 1975
- Region: Northern Ireland; Republic of Ireland
- Most successful club(s): Portadown; Waterford (1 title each)

The Texaco Cup was an association football competition featuring clubs from Northern Ireland and the Republic of Ireland that ran for two seasons in 1974 and 1975. The tournament was sponsored by American petroleum giant Texaco.

The competition had its origins in the original Texaco Cup which began in 1970 as a competition for English, Scottish, Northern Irish and Irish clubs that had not qualified for European competitions. Irish and Northern Irish clubs competed in 1970-71 and 1971-72 but then withdrew due to political pressure at the time. Texaco organised the Texaco (All-Ireland) Cup, a separate competition, for the Irish teams in 1973-74 and 1974-75.

== List of finals ==
Season	Winner (number of titles)	Score	Runner-up	Venue
1973–74	(Northern Ireland) Portadown (1)	4 – 1	(Republic of Ireland) Bohemians	Shamrock Park, Portadown
1973–74	(Northern Ireland) Portadown (1)	2 – 1 (5 – 3 agg.)	(Republic of Ireland) Bohemians	Dalymount Park, Dublin
1974–75	(Republic of Ireland) Waterford (1)	1 – 0	(Northern Ireland) Linfield	Kilcohan Park, Waterford
1974–75	(Republic of Ireland) Waterford (1)	0 – 0 (1 – 0 agg.)	(Northern Ireland) Linfield	Windsor Park, Belfast

== See also ==
- Texaco Cup
