= Floodlit Cup (Northern Ireland) =

- Organiser(s): Irish Football Association
- Founded: 1987
- Abolished: 1998
- Region: Northern Ireland
- Most championships: Portadown (3 titles)

The Floodlit Cup (more commonly known as the Budweiser Floodlit Cup, Budweiser Cup or Coca-Cola Cup for sponsorship reasons) was an annual football competition organised by the Irish Football League in the late-1980s and 1990s.

== History ==
By the mid-1980s all Irish League clubs had installed floodlighting at their grounds, largely through grants awarded by the Football Trust. This presented the opportunity for the founding of a new competition with the prospect of much needed sponsorship revenue. Budweiser was announced as the sponsor of this new competition, presenting a total prize fund of £12,000 for competing teams and administration. A distinctive trophy was produced, featuring the sponsor's name, and this was awarded for the first time on December 15, 1987 to Glentoran.

Budweiser remained sponsor of the Floodlit Cup until 1994/95 with Portadown winning the trophy for a record third time. With Budweiser's withdrawal as sponsors the competition was immediately replaced by the Coca-Cola Floodlit Cup (the Budweiser branded trophy ended at this point). The Coca-Cola Floodlit Cup was a new trophy, and in the years that followed the term "Floodlit" became less prevalent. The Coca-Cola Floodlit Cup itself lapsed in 1998/99 with the remainder of the company's six-year sponsorship deal transferring to the Irish League Cup as the number of competitions open to Irish League clubs was reduced.

== Format ==
- 1987/88

Open to all 14 Irish League clubs. Played on a single match, straight knock-out basis with extra-time and a penalty shoot-out if required. Semi-finals and finals played on a neutral ground. The top two teams from the previous season’s Irish League given a bye to the second round.

- 1988/89 to 1989/90

Entrants increased to 16 with the inclusion of B Division teams, Omagh Town and Ballyclare Comrades (who were due to join an expanded Irish League in 1990/91). First round played on a two legged, home and away basis using the away goal rule, followed by extra-time and penalties if the aggregate score was level. Quarter-final and semi-final matches played as a single match with extra-time and penalties, with semis and final again at a neutral venue. Final match open to a replay if scores remained level after extra-time.

- 1990/91 to 1994/95

Reverted to original straight knock-out format but with sixteen teams.

- 1995/96 to 1996/97

The Irish League split into two divisions for the 1995/96 season and Coca-Cola took over the sponsorship of the Floodlit Cup. The competition remained open to the 16 Irish League clubs (8 Premier Division and 8 First Division) and reverted to a two legged first round format, with the draw seeded so Premier League teams met First Division teams. From the quarter-finals on the format remained the same as in previous years.

- 1997/98 (final year)

The Irish League had expanded again, to 18 teams (10 Premier and 8 First Division), for the final season of the Coca-Cola Floodlit Cup. A preliminary round was introduced, played on a single match basis, to bring the field down to 16 teams with the remainder of the competition played out as it had been in 1987/88 and from 1990/91 to 1994/95.

== List of finals ==
Key:

(a.e.t.)	Scores level after extra time. A replay was required.

Season	Winner (number of titles)	Score	Runner-up	Venue	Attendance
1987–88	Glentoran (1)	1–0	Coleraine	Windsor Park, Belfast
1988–89	Glenavon (1)	1 – 1 (a.e.t.)	Linfield	The Oval, Belfast
Replay	Glenavon (1)	6–1	Linfield	The Oval, Belfast
1989–90	Glentoran (2)	4–2	Linfield	The Oval, Belfast
1990–91	Portadown (1)	2–0	Glenavon	Windsor Park, Belfast
1991–92	Omagh Town (1)	3–1	Linfield	The Oval, Belfast
1992–93	Portadown (2)	3–1	Ballymena United	Windsor Park, Belfast
1993–94	Linfield (1)	3–0	Ards	The Oval, Belfast
1994–95	Portadown (3)	4–0	Distillery	Mourneview Park, Lurgan
1995–96	Cliftonville (1)	3–1	Glentoran	Windsor Park, Belfast
1996–97	Glenavon (2)	1–0	Glentoran	Windsor Park, Belfast
1997–98	Linfield (2)	2–0	Cliftonville	Windsor Park, Belfast

== Performance by club ==
Club	Winners	Runners-up	Winning years	Runners-up years
Portadown	3	0	1990–91, 1992–93, 1994–95	—
Linfield	2	3	1993–94, 1997–98	1988–89, 1989–90, 1991–92
Glentoran	2	2	1987–88, 1989–90	1995–96, 1996–97
Glenavon	2	1	1988–89, 1996–97	1990–91
Cliftonville	1	1	1995–96	1997–98
Omagh Town	1	0	1991–92	—
Coleraine	0	1	—	1987–88
Ballymena United	0	1	—	1992–93
Ards	0	1	—	1993–94
Distillery	0	1	—	1994–95
