= Lee Doherty (footballer, born 1963) =

Northern Ireland footballer

Personal information
- Date of birth: 31 March 1963 (age 63)
- Place of birth: Belfast, Northern Ireland
- Height: 1.80 m (5 ft 11 in)
- Position: Midfielder

Senior career*
Years	Team	Apps	(Gls)
1981–1994	Linfield	241	(34)
1994–2000	Glenavon	188	(11)
Total		429	(45)

International career
1984–1987	Northern Ireland	2	(1)
- * Club domestic league appearances and goals

Lee Doherty (born 31 March 1963) is a Northern Irish former football player and coach.

== Playing career ==
Born in Belfast, Doherty played as a midfielder for Linfield and Glenavon. He also earned two caps for the Northern Ireland national team.

== Coaching career ==
He later worked as an assistant manager at Ballymena United, between 2011 and 2016.

== Personal life ==
After retiring as a player he became an architect. He is married with two daughters.
