= St Julian's Road =

Demolished former football stadium, Northern Ireland

- Location: Omagh, Northern Ireland
- Record attendance: 8,000

Construction
- Opened: 1990
- Closed: 2005
- Demolished: 2020 (now St Julians Park)

Tenant
- 1990-2005 Omagh Town

St Julian's Road is a former football stadium in Omagh, Northern Ireland. It was the home ground of Omagh Town until the dissolution of the club in June 2005. The ground, which featured a grass pitch, had a capacity of 5000, made up of thirty 30 VIP places, 250 covered seats, 4720 standing places (3220 covered and 1500 uncovered). In 2020 the former site of the ground was demolished after laying derelict since the clubs demise and renovated into St Julians Park.

== History ==
Town first leased the Mullaghmore site, which had previously served as a rubbish tip, from Omagh District Council in 1987, with the stadium opening three years later. As well as football the ground has also hosted Gaelic Athletic Association events.

== Charity matches ==
Among the clubs to play at St. Julian's Road were Manchester United, who faced Omagh Town in a friendly game there in 1999 in order to raise money for the Omagh bombing appeal. The match ended in a 9–0 win to the visitors with Teddy Sheringham netting four times. Both Chelsea and Liverpool also faced the home side at St Julian's Road as part of the same charity initiative.

== Current use ==
Following the collapse of the football club, the stadium fell into disuse although in January 2010, Sean Begley, a Sinn Féin councillor, brought a proposal before the council to revive St Julian's Road as a football venue. In 2020 the remains of the ground were demolished and renovated into a public park.
