= Martin McGaughey =

Northern Irish footballer

Martin McGaughey (born 31 August 1960) is a Northern Irish retired footballer who played as a striker.

Having spent most of his career at Linfield, he was noted for his scoring ability, being nicknamed 'Buckets'.

== Club career ==
McGaughey was born in Moneyreagh. Having signed as a youth with Linfield F.C. in 1977, he made his first-team debut midway through 1980–81, finishing his first season with 14 goals in all competitions, including a brace in the County Antrim Shield final against Glentoran (4–1).

In 1984–85, McGaughey finished second in the European Golden Shoe race to FC Porto's Fernando Gomes, scoring 34 league goals in 26 matches (57 overall) and failing to add more as his season was cut short due to a severe knee injury. In the team's campaign in the European Cup, he helped it reach the second round, where he scored twice in a 3–3 home draw to Panathinaikos (4–5 aggregate exit); subsequently, he was named the Ulster Footballer of the Year.

Although he received a lot of interest from 'larger' clubs – notably England's Barnsley – McGaughey never left the country, and finished his career with a season at Ards, retiring in 1994 due to recurrent physical problems. He netted 317 competitive goals for Linfield in 533 appearances, also being team and league top scorer in 1983–84 (15 goals), 1987–88 (18) and 1989–90 (19), and helped the side to six national championships and one domestic cup.

== International career ==
McGaughey won one cap for Northern Ireland, replacing legendary Norman Whiteside in a friendly against Israel in October 1984.
