= Portadown F.C. =

Association football club in Northern Ireland

Portadown
- Full name: Portadown Football Club
- Nicknames: The Ports; Wee Reds; Shamrock Aces
- Founded: 1887; 139 years ago
- Ground: Shamrock Park
- Capacity: 2,770
- Chairman: David Jameson Sr
- Manager: David Jeffrey MBE
- League: NIFL Premiership
- 2025–26: NIFL Premiership, 8th of 12
- Website: www.portadownfc.co.uk
Home colours	Away colours

Portadown Football Club is a semi-professional Northern Irish football club who play in the NIFL Premiership.

The club was formed in 1887 as a junior team seeking to participate in the Mid-Ulster Cup, eventually joining the Irish League with the support of other local clubs in 1924. Portadown are part of the Mid-Ulster F.A.

They are based in Portadown, County Armagh and play their home matches at Shamrock Park. The club's colours are red and white. Their home are kit consists of red shirts, red shorts and red socks with white trim on all.

The club badge shows an apple due to Armagh being the 'Orchard County', a shamrock for their home venue and location in Ireland, and a rose for the McGredy family rose growers. The red and white stripes represent Portadown railway station as the 'Hub of the North'.

The club's main rivals are Glenavon, with their matches being known as the "Mid Ulster Derby". The club also has a longstanding rivalry with Glentoran.

== History ==
=== Junior years (1886–1924) ===
The Mid Ulster Football Association was established in 1887 and a series of meetings were held in the Young Men's Institute in Edward Street in Portadown to create a club to compete in the Mid-Ulster Cup. Early matches were played at Tavanagh, Ripley's Field, Armagh Road and Old Shamrock Park which was located close to the site of what is now Clounagh Junior High School. Among the early names to turn out for The Ports were Val Wilson, who would later become High Sheriff for County Armagh; and Harry Bell, whose father owned brickworks on the Armagh Road.

The club won the Irish Junior Cup after defeating Larne at Grosvenor Park on 18 March 1899. That same season, The Ports won their first ever cup double by winning the Mid-Ulster Cup for the first time. Portadown retained the trophy the following season and the following next five seasons before the outbreak of World War I. While the Irish Intermediate League was formed in 1916, and Portadown were selected as one of its inaugural clubs, they withdrew as a large number of the club's players left to fight in World War I. With the return of local men from the war, there was a demand for senior football in the region. A number of junior clubs in the area put aside their rivalries and backed Portadown's bid to join the Irish League. In 1923, the Irish League was expanded from six to ten clubs with the introduction of Newry Town, Ards and Barn. Subsequently, after a number of years of preparation, representatives of the club (including William Mullen, Tom Dawson and a committee) met the league chiefs in June 1924 and were able to present a case for joining the league. Portadown became a full member club of the Irish League together with the readmittance of Belfast Celtic.

=== Early Irish League years (1924–1932) ===
Portadown played their first senior game, in August 1924, against Glentoran. The first Irish League game played at Shamrock Park was against the champions Queens Island in a game that finished 0–0.

In that first season, Portadown finished fourth, two points behind Belfast Celtic with Queens Island taking second place, behind champions Glentoran. Along the way, The Ports played some memorable matches, including a 4–3 victory over Linfield at Shamrock Park and a 1–0 win against Belfast Celtic in the City Cup.

The 1925–26 season saw a continuation of their consolidation in the league with away victories at both Belfast Celtic and Linfield.

After nine seasons in senior football, Portadown won their first senior trophy, defeating Glentoran 1–0 at Solitude in the Gold Cup Final. Around 5,000 fans travelled to witness the win. With three minutes remaining and the scores level at 0–0, William Johnston scored the winning goal.

As the team returned to town that night, they were met by thousands of people at the railway station and toured the town in an open top bus before stopping at St. Mark's Church for speeches. Chairman William Mullen led the speeches before igniting a large bonfire.

=== Tommy Sloan trophy winning era (1932–1938) ===
Tommy Sloan was appointed manager in 1932 and his and Portadown's first major trophy success came in the 1933–34 season when they won the Gold Cup under Sloan's charge and won the same trophy again in the 1937–38 season before his resignation due to the coming war in 1938. He was replaced by Hugh Bullough, but would return to the club for a brief spell during World War II.

=== Postwar era (1945–1954) ===
Post-war, Portadown were in the shadow of Mid Ulster rivals Glenavon, who were undergoing their period of glory years in the 1950s that is yet to be repeated by The Lurgan Blues.

=== Gibby McKenzie era (1958–1977) ===
In 1958, the club appointed Scottish manager Gibby McKenzie. The press described him as "the fast-talking Scot with the fanatical zeal for the game who eats sleeps and breathes football" after Harry Walker's short spell in charge. McKenzie very nearly clinched that first elusive league title in the 1960–61 season with Albert Mitchell missing a penalty that would have secured the league championship against Glentoran and in the 1961–62 season, where they finished second to Linfield in these seasons and finished third in the Irish League the following season. McKenzie left The Ports for good in 1977 after his second spell in charge of the club.

=== Bertie Neil era (1977–1979) ===
In 1977, the club appointed former Bangor Bertie Neil, famed for the development of Northern Ireland legend and now Sky Sports commentator Gerry Armstrong. Neil's spell, although short, was considered successful, with another Gold Cup and an Irish Cup Final appearance in a 3–2 defeat to Cliftonville. In 1979, the club announced that Neil had left the club "by mutual consent".

=== Terry Kingon era (1983–1986) ===
After Jon Flanagan's short spell in charge, the club appointed former player Terry Kingon. His team reached the Ulster Cup final in 1985, defeating Linfield 3–1 in the semi-final at The Oval. But the serious injury in that match to star Scottish striker Billy Paton (who had scored 28 goals the previous season for The Ports) was a devastating blow.

Portadown held Coleraine to a 0–0 draw during the 90 minutes but collapsed in extra-time, losing 5–0. Paton, who had started the game with pain-killing injections, broke down early on. Deprived of his scoring qualities for the rest of the season, Portadown struggled financially and this resulted in the sale of the training ground to meet creditors' demands. Kingon did his best with limited resources and one of the fascinating features of his season in charge at Shamrock Park was the large number of drawn games involving Portadown. In fact, before he resigned in December 1986, Portadown had drawn 9 of the first 14 Irish League games, losing the other five.

=== Ronnie McFall era (1986–2016) ===
From December 1986 to March 2016, the club's manager was Ronnie McFall. He signed another in five-year contract in 2009 and signed a two-year deal in August 2014. McFall brought several successes to the club, winning their first ever league title in 1989 and league title wins in 1991, 1996 and in 2002; he also won three Irish Cups. He was born and raised in Portadown and played left-back for the club during the 1960s and 1970s. He has also played for Dundee United of Scotland, and afterwards Ards and Glentoran, the latter where he began his managerial career. McFall was the longest serving manager in European football, surpassing Sir Alex Ferguson in 2013. McFall is one of the most successful managers in Irish league football. Following a run of poor results, McFall announced he would step down from his position as manager following a 3–2 defeat to Lurgan Celtic in the Irish Cup quarter-final.

In the 1989–90 season, the club finally won the Irish League, and in the final match there was a pitch invasion by the club's fans. In the following 1990–91 season, the club dominated the Irish League, nearly defeating every team in the division. They retained the title that season and they beat rivals Glenavon in the Irish cup final 2–1 to secure the club's first ever league and cup double. The season after was less successful with a number players starting to age and attendances started to fall.

In the 1993–94 season, the club had partially recovered from this slump and were involved in a three-way battle for the title between themselves and Linfield and Glenavon. With an updated, The Ports took on Glenavon and the winners would secure the league title, however a draw at Mourneview Park would hand the title to Linfield. Glenavon raced into a two-goal lead against Portadown at Mourneview Park, and with Linfield drawing with Glentoran, The Lurgan Blues would have won their first league title in 34 years. However, Portadown scored two quick fire goals to level it at 2–2 and with Linfield beating The Glens – the Belfast side were now champions. Everything at Mourneview had now turned in Portadown's favor, who were creating chance after chance with the Ports missing the chance to win the title themselves when Robert Casey missed an easy chance, with Linfield eventually being crowned champions. For the 1995–96 season, a new crest was introduced and The Ports won their third league title that season, with Gary Haylock and Sandy Fraser the instigators in the title winning team.

==== Transitional period (1996–2000) ====
After their title win, the club lost several players to retirement and to other clubs. McFall signed Notts County striker Vinny Arkins, who noted that McFall refused to let him walk away from talks until he signed the contract offered to him. A generation of players such as Philip Major and Kyle Neill coming through and a few signings helped McFall build another team to win yet another league title in 2002 and losing 2–1 to Linfield in the Irish Cup Final to prevent another league and cup double.

Thereafter, the club implemented cost-cutting measures and several aging players retired or moved to larger clubs. The club's last major trophy came in 2005 when the club took on Larne in the Irish Cup Final, with the Inver Park side scoring early on before The Ports scored five goals to secure the Irish Cup.

==== Demotion (2008) ====
On 30 April 2008, Portadown, who had been a senior football club in Northern Ireland since 1924, were demoted to the Championship as a result of the club's final application form for the new IFA Premiership (due to replace the Irish Premier League for 2008–09) having been received 29 minutes late and thus not considered. The club unsuccessfully appealed its exclusion. Due to the drop from Northern Ireland's top domestic football league, the IFA Premiership, Portadown took on intermediate status, due to the IFA Championship, which was Northern Ireland's second tier of football, being an intermediate league at the time. McFall described the time as "the toughest point of his managerial career" but kept several star players and in their first season in the Championship. The club won promotion straight back into senior football, defeating their closest rivals Donegal Celtic 2–0 in the last (and decisive) match of the season. Also, after beating Newry City 1–0 at Mourneview Park on 28 February 2009, Portadown became the first intermediate club to win the Irish League Cup with Scotsman Gary McCutcheon scoring the winning goal.

==== Top-flight Return, European Football and Cup finals (2009–15) ====
Portadown qualified to play UEFA Europa League football in the 2010–11 season on account of being runners-up in the 2009–10 Irish Cup to Linfield. They famously defeated professional side and Latvian champions Skonto 2–1 on aggregate to advance to the second qualifying round. It was their first win in European competition since 1974. The second qualifying round first leg match was played at Shamrock Park on 15 July 2010, with Richard Lecky scoring the opening goal against Azerbaijani champions FK Qarabağ, but two second-half goals from Afran Ismayilov saw the away side take a 2–1 lead back home for the second leg on 22 July. The second leg in Baku ended 1–1 with The Ports taking the lead through a free-kick from Kevin Braniff. Despite an effort against the Azerbaijani champions, it was not enough for The Ports to progress to the next round and they were eliminated 3–2 on aggregate.

The 2011–12 season saw The Ports recover and mount a title challenge that was largely spearheaded by Welsh striker Matthew Tipton, with themselves and Linfield the runaway leaders in the race. However, The Ports' challenge began to fade following an injury to Tipton, and Linfield finished comfortably as champions.

The 2012–13 season saw Matthew Tipton sign for champions Linfield and another European win against Macedonian side Shkëndija in the summertime. The Ports would take on Slaven Belupo of Croatia in the next round, with the promise of a mouth watering tie against La Liga side Athletic Bilbao should they progress. Any hopes of progression were quickly dashed when the Ports lost 6–0 at the Gradski stadion Ivan Kušek-Apaš, being hampered by the unavailability of goalkeeper David Miskelly, with a respectable 4–2 defeat at Shamrock Park ending the clubs time in Europe, its last to date.

The Ports would make waves in the transfer market in January when it was announced they had beaten strong competition from The Blues for Shamrock Rovers striker Gary Twigg, who scored on his league debut against Donegal Celtic, although The Ports could only muster a seventh-place finish in quite a disappointing season.

The 2013–14 season was a largely frustrating one of what might have been, with Gary Twigg playing a valuable part and scoring regularly, along with in-form young striker Darren Murray and some of Kevin Braniff's moments of sheer class displayed at times and the skill of Peter McMahon. The club showed form at times capable of winning the league by beating rivals Glenavon comfortably and notably beating Ballinamallard United 11–0. However, poor results against teams lower in the table meant they finished only fourth, and a falling-out between striker Kevin Braniff and Ronnie McFall resulted in the former leaving the club and moving to Australian side Port Melbourne.

In the 2014–15 season, The Ports signed Linfield playmaker Robert Garrett, Blues captain Michael Gault and reliable Blues striker Mark McAilaster. This had meant a lot was expected of the club to challenge for the title and they started the season with an impressive 3–0 win over Warren Feeney's Linfield and several wins over Glenavon and eventual champions Crusaders They also showed the capability of being champions when in a match against basement side Institute; with the match leveled at 1–1 in the dying minutes, Michael Gault scored a late, long distance effort to secure the three points. However, a shock 2–1 defeat away to Warrenpoint Town saw The Ports miss out on the chance to go seven points clear in the NIFL Premiership, and the club lost 3–2 to Linfield, with Ross Redman missing a penalty in the final minute of the match. This saw The Ports fall away in the league, but in the Irish Cup quarter-final, they took on Linfield once again at Shamrock Park. Portadown were 3–0 up after about 30 minutes. They went on to win the match 3–2.

Portadown took on Ballymena United in the Irish Cup semi-final at The Oval. Portadown sealed their place in the final by winning 3–1. With the Kop Stand at Windsor Park collapsing, the final was forced to be moved to The Oval, where they would take on Glentoran. In the league, Portadown played Glenavon at Mourneview Park with the winner being guaranteed third place and a lucrative UEFA Europa League qualifying round spot. Glenavon raced into a two-goal lead before James Singleton was sent off for clashing with Ken Oman. Portadown had levelled it 2–2 through Peter McMahon and Gary Twigg goals, before Eoin Bradley was hauled down by Ross Redman and a last-minute penalty was dispatched by Andy McGory to give the Lurgan Blues European football. The Irish Cup final at The Oval saw the Ports go into the game as favourites, in what was initially quite a cagey affair on an incredibly wet day in East Belfast. In the second half, David Scullion scored to give The Glens the lead and what would prove to be the only goal of the game after an incredibly controversial moment, when Ports midfielder Michael Gault was fouled clean through on goal, and Glens keeper Elliott Morris picked up the resulting pass, with the referee, linesman and goal line official unbelievably letting play continue. Goal line official, Raymond Crangle would state in the aftermath his apology to Portadown officials, stating his belief that he thought it was a clear foul, but due to a technical glitch with his headset, was unable to attract the referees attention. Ports boss Ronnie McFall was quoted in saying the following: "It was a trip and straight red card, the television pictures clearly show that," he blasted. "Gary Twigg was also pulled down in the box in the first half and there was a blatant handball in the second half but the referee and officials just weren't up to it. "They keep making major mistakes and they are never downgraded. Things carry on as if nothing happened. "It's a straight red card and free-kick for us. And it's not one person making a decision, you have the assistant and man behind the goals and they missed these incidents? "I'm looking at the standard of refereeing and some of them should still be in junior football, learning the game."

==== 2015–16 season-End of McFall Era ====
The club suffered greatly financially from the result in the final meaning their transfer activity was limited in the summer of 2015. However, they started the season by beating the champions Crusaders 2–1 and Warrenpoint Town by the same scoreline three days later. Results declined rapidly thereafter, and the fans began to pressure the board to consider McFall's position as manager. The manager and staff were barracked by the support, and during a 3–1 defeat to Crusaders at Shamrock Park, supporters protested with a banner asking for the sacking of the manager, which was removed by the chairman, who argued with supporters. After the game assistant manager Kieran Harding, accusing Portadown fans protesting as being "...not real supporters," called them "Imposters".

In January the club signed former Linfield midfielder Philip Lowry in the hope that fortunes would improve. Lowry created a reasonable impact, scoring from outside the box in a win over Coleraine in the Irish Cup, and again in a 2–1 win over Linfield. Things were slowly improving until Portadown were beaten 4–1 by rivals Glenavon at Mourneview Park.

The club took on NIFL Championship 1 side Lurgan Celtic in the Irish Cup Quarter Final, with the Lurgan side scoring twice in quick succession to go into a 2–0 lead at halftime. Portadown piled on the pressure in the second half to level the score at 2–2 with goals from Marcio Soares and Sean Mackle, before conceding a penalty in the closing minutes which Lurgan Celtic defender Raymond Fitzpatrick converted to send the Lurgan side through to their first-ever Irish Cup Semi Final against Linfield. The result that afternoon marked Ronnie McFall's last game as Portadown boss. He resigned following the defeat, marking an end to his 29 years at the club.

The following day, it was announced former defender Pat McGibbon, who had come in earlier that season as the club's physiotherapist, would take over as interim manager until the end of the season, with club legend Vinny Arkins coming on board as his assistant coach. Despite only winning once in ten games as caretaker manager, McGibbon was appointed as manager on a two-year contract and helped the club avoid relegation. They finished the season ninth in the league.

==== 2016–17 season ====
Before the start of 2016–17 season, the club was fined £10,000 which was halved on appeal to £5,000 and received a one-year ban on signing professional contracts until June 2017 for not declaring extra payments made to striker Gary Twigg for performing coaching work over the summer. The club also received a 12-point deduction in the league for 2016–17 season for an administrative error made in relation to the contract of exiled midfielder Peter McMahon, who later left the club in July 2016.

Despite starting the season with a major disadvantage, McGibbons side produced victories over Carrick Rangers and Ballinamallard United and were narrowly beaten by many of the teams higher up in the table. However, after a series of poor results in October 2016, Pat McGibbon resigned as manager.

Both Arkins and long serving coach Trevor Williamson remained at the club with Arkins taking over as caretaker manager. Arkins took charge for the match against Coleraine at Shamrock Park, where they lost 1–0.

Arkins won his first official match in charge as interim manager in a 2–1 win against Ballinamallard United with goals from Stephen Hughes and a penalty from Niall Henderson. It was followed up with a 3–1 win over Ards with goals from Robert Garrett, Stephen Hughes and Brendan Shannon scoring his first goal for the club from the penalty spot. However, it was later found that the club had fielded midfielder Robert Garrett, who was supposed to be serving a one-game ban with Ards officials informing the club that they believed that Garrett was suspended. Ards were subsequently awarded a 3–0 win with the Ports being fined £500. Arkins left the club following a 0–5 defeat to Linfield. On 5 December 2016, Portadown-born Niall Currie was appointed as manager after successfully agreeing his release from Ards with him and his loyal assistant Jay Willis joining the club. Upon his first match against Cliftonville at Solitude, they were defeated 1–0. Prior to the match, it was announced that longtime goalkeeper David Miskelly would be retiring immediately due to a shoulder injury sustained the previous season after serving 12 years and making over 400 appearances with the club.

Currie's first win as Portadown manager came in a 2–0 win over Dungannon Swifts at Shamrock Park. The Ports approached the annual Boxing Day derby with rivals Glenavon not being in great form with the Ports racing into a surprise two-goal lead with goals from Mark Carson and Aaron Haire. However, the Lurgan Blues had seemingly grabbed a point with them pulling a goal back within the last ten minutes and Sykes scoring a long distance free kick in the dying seconds of the game amid wild scenes of celebration from the Glenavon supporters. Portadown's luck had finally changed, however, with it later being found that Glenavon had fielded defender David Elebert, who was due to serve a suspension through yellow cards picked up in reserve league fixtures with the Lurgan side, receiving a fine, and the Ports being awarded a 3–0 win and a valuable 3 three points.

The club earned a 1–1 draw with title chasing Linfield at Windsor Park. This was followed up with another credible 1–1 draw with champions Crusaders. The club went into a game against relegation rivals Carrick Rangers with the knowledge that a defeat would all but condemn them to relegation to which they lost the game 3–2.The Ports' relegation was officially confirmed following a 3–2 defeat to Ards on Easter Tuesday fixture.

==== Championship spell 2017–20 ====
The summer following Portadown's relegation saw significant changes in the playing line up. The club opened their Championship campaign with a 3–0 win over Larne and a 2–1 win over Limavady United at Shamrock Park before dropping their first points in a 1–1 draw away to PSNI. The following fixture was the first defeat for the Ports in the Championship, losing 2–1 at home to Institute. The response that followed was a 4–1 win away to Newry City. However the response was short lived and saw four consecutive league defeats to Dergview, Knockbreda, H&W Welders and Ballyclare Comrades with mounting pressure on Ports boss Niall Currie who had built a team which very quickly had not lived up to expectations. A 3–0 win over Loughgall served to paper over the cracks for a Saturday, before a 1–4 home defeat to Newry drew heavy criticism from the home support who made their feelings well known throughout the game and at full time.

At this point the club, who had expected winning the league and promotion as a certainty was languishing closer to the bottom of the league than the top with the thoughts of potentially another relegation entering the minds of many. The winter period however saw a slightly better improvement with the Ports picking up 15 points from the next eight games which included a 1–1 draw and a 6–0 win over Lurgan Celtic and a 7–0 win over Dergview having lost to the Castlederg side earlier in the season. Furthermore, the Boxing Day fixture saw a 4–1 win away to Loughgall which featured a hat trick from Gary Warwick. The January period saw the Ports sitting in 6th place with the split looming and picking up 5 points from 3 games to secure a top six with a late equalizer against Larne (Sitting in 7th) scored by Chris Lavery sealing it. Furthermore, however The Ports lost out in the Irish Cup in extra time to league rivals to Ballyclare Comrades.

What followed was a run of fixtures that was of huge importance which started with a 2–1 win over Loughgall with many thinking that the team had hit form at just the right time. The positivity quickly disappeared however following a 1–0 defeat away to Ballyclare Comrades in the first of nine crucial fixtures and what was the 4th defeat that season to Ballyclare. The following fixture saw a 0–0 draw with the Welders, the game saw the end of Niall Curries tenure as Portadown manager who was relieved of his duties following the result. In February 2018 it was confirmed that Portadown had made an approach and had been successful in appointing ex striker and Warrenpoint Town boss Matthew Tipton with David Miskelly joining as his assistant.

In Tiptons first game in charge the Ports secured a 1–1 draw with league leaders Institute and 4 consecutive wins followed against Loughgall, Newry City and Harland and Wolff Welders with anticipation building that a play off spot would have been very much possible. The team were positioned in 4th place needing 3rd to secure a play off place. A huge game away to Newry City followed with three points for the men in red securing a pre play off spot against Newry. The game ultimately ended 0–0 with a red card for Jamie Douglas and the visitors ultimately coming up short.

The following season, Tipton would seek to shape the Portadown squad to his liking, making a total of 16 signings notably Kevin Braniff and Johnny Flynn on free transfers from Ballymena United, former players Darren Murray and Sean Mackle returned to the club from Crusaders and Warrenpoint Town respectively. That particular season the Ports were challenged in a big way by Larne F.C., who were now subject to significant investment and were favourites to win the NIFL Championship in 2019. The first ten games of the season would see the Ports pick up 5 wins, 4 draws and 1 defeat in what was a fairly respectable return from the opening part of the season that saw them score 19 points out of a possible 30. As the season progressed, they often failed to pick up points away from home that saw them ultimately finish in third place behind Larne and Carrick Rangers with the latter overcoming the men in red in a promotion playoff which the Gers won 2–0.

=== Promotion and Premiership spells 2020- ===
The club achieved promotion in the 2020-21 NIFL Championship season, having fought Ballinamallard United down to the wire, in a season that was curtailed by the COVID-19 pandemic. The following season, the Ports finished 9th, with wins over Glenavon and Larne to secure NIFL Premiership safety. Striker Lee Bonis contributed 14 goals throughout the season.

The following season proved to be a more difficult one, which saw the departure of manager Matthew Tipton with the club languishing in the relegation play-off place, under threat from the chasing Warrenpoint Town. Former midfielder Paul Doolin was appointed as Tiptons replacement, and his initial appointment saw Ports defeat Warrenpoint Town, Ballymena United and Coleraine to secure safety from automatic relegation and set up a play-off with neighbors Annagh United. A standout performance from Billy Stedman saw the Ports come from 2–1 down to win 3–2 in the 1st leg, and a 1–0 win in the 2nd leg securing safety for the 2021–22 season.

The following season the Ports would struggle for form, picking up just 1 point from 11 games, with heavy criticism from supporters following a 3–1 home defeat to newly promoted Newry City, in what many considered a must win game, and a worrying sign of what was to come. Doolin would depart the club after a 4–0 defeat away to Crusaders the following game.

The club would move fairly quickly to appoint Dundela manager Niall Currie, who previously managed the Ports from 2016 to 2018. Currie would bring in former Glenavon striker and free agent Greg Moorhouse, who would prove a needed addition to address the Ports lack of goals.

The Ports would continue to struggle before Christmas, picking up their first win of the season at home to Ballymena United on 10 December. Currie would sign heavily in the January transfer window, bringing in players from former club Dundela, as well as notably Cathair Friel and Alan O'Sullivan, on loan from Coleraine and Warrenpoint Town respectively, and Paul McElroy from Ballymena United.

O'Sullivan would star with two goals in a 3–1 win over Mid Ulster rivals Glenavon in February, with the Ports picking up a further 10 points from the next 5 games, including a 4–3 win away to Newry City, having been 3–2 down in stoppage time, with some heralding 'The Great Escape' for a side whose survival hopes appeared to be gone at Christmas. However, the great escape wasn't to be, and the Ports 3–2 defeat away to relegation rivals Dungannon Swifts sealed their relegation after a spirited survival attempt under Currie.

The Ports would have a relatively difficult start to life in the Championship, which saw defeats to Bangor, H&W Welders and Ballyclare Comrades, however would remain in promotion contention. The Ports would also defeat Dungannon Swifts in the final of the Mid-Ulster Cup, their first win and appearance in the final of the competition since 2003, and would also reach the final of the League Cup for the first time since 2011, following wins over Coagh United, Crusaders, Loughgall and Glenavon to set up a final against Linfield.

The Ports would seal their return to the NIFL Premiership following a draw with table rivals Dundela, lifting the trophy the following week against Institute.

Following back to back 9th place finishes under Niall Currie, and noted wins over Larne, Glentoran and Linfield, Currie would be dismissed for a second time, with legendary former Linfield and Ballymena United boss David Jeffrey returning to the game as his replacement, having being linked with the job several times historically. Jeffreys start to life at Shamrock Park would prove a tough one, losing his first 3 games against Carrick Rangers, Dungannon Swifts and Carrick Rangers.

== Average attendance ==
Attendance at Shamrock Park
Season	No of Home Games	Total Season Attendance	Average Per Game
2009–10	17	15,241	971
2010–11	18	13,373	743
2011–12	17	14,854	874
2012–13	18		758
2013–14	19	14,040	990
2014–15	19	18,099	1,001
2015–16	19	12,633	713
2016–17	18	15,186	947
(Data from 2017 to 2020 unavailable)
2020–21 (restricted due to COVID-19 regulations)	20 (17 took place behind closed doors)	1,397	500
2021-22	20	18,410	1,237

== European record ==
Season	Competition	Round	Opponent	Home	Away	Agg
1962–63	Cup Winners Cup	R1	(Socialist Federal Republic of Yugoslavia) OFK Beograd	3–2	1–5	4–7
1974–75	UEFA Cup	R1	(Iceland) Valur	2–1	0–0	2–1
1974–75	UEFA Cup	R2	(Socialist Federal Republic of Yugoslavia) Partizan	1–1	0–5	1–6
1990–91	European Cup	R1	(Portugal) Porto	1–8	0–5	1–13
1991–92	European Cup	R1	(Socialist Federal Republic of Yugoslavia) Red Star Belgrade	0–4	0–4	0–8
1992–93	UEFA Cup	R1	(Belgium) Standard Liège	0–0	0–5	0–5
1994–95	UEFA Cup	PR	(Slovakia) Slovan Bratislava	0–2	0–3	0–5
1996–97	UEFA Cup	PR	(Federal Republic of Yugoslavia) Vojvodina	0–1	1–4	1–5
1999–2000	UEFA Cup	QR	(Bulgaria) CSKA Sofia	0–3	0–5	0–8
2002–03	UEFA Champions League	QR1	(Belarus) Belshina Bobruisk	0–0	2–3	2–3
2003–04	UEFA Cup	QR	(Sweden) Malmö FF	0–2	0–4	0–6
2004–05	UEFA Cup	QR1	(Lithuania) Žalgiris	2–2	0–2	2–4
2005–06	UEFA Cup	QR1	(Norway) Viking	1–2	0–1	1–3
2006–07	UEFA Cup	QR1	(Lithuania) FBK Kaunas	1–3	0–1	1–4
2010–11	UEFA Europa League	QR1	(Latvia) Skonto	1–1	1–0	2–1
2010–11	UEFA Europa League	QR2	(Azerbaijan) Qarabağ	1–2	1–1	2–3
2012–13	UEFA Europa League	QR1	(North Macedonia) Shkëndija	2–1	0–0	2–1
2012–13	UEFA Europa League	QR2	(Croatia) Slaven Belupo	2–4	0–6	2–10

=== By competition ===
Competition	P	W	D	L	GF	GA
European Cup / UEFA Champions League	6	0	1	5	3	24
UEFA Cup / UEFA Europa League	28	3	7	18	16	62
European Cup Winners' Cup / UEFA Cup Winners' Cup	2	1	0	1	4	7
Total	36	4	8	24	23	93

Last updated on 26 February 2023.

== Current squad ==
As of 24 July 2026

Note: Flags indicate national team as defined under FIFA eligibility rules; some limited exceptions apply. Players may hold more than one non-FIFA nationality.

No.	Pos.	Nation	Player
1	GK	IRL	Aaron McCarey
2	DF	IRL	Divin Isamala
3	DF	NIR	Matthew Carson
4	DF	ENG	Barış Altıntop
5	DF	NIR	Lewis MacKinnon
6	MF	IRL	Rabby Tabu Minzamba
7	MF	NIR	Lee Chapman
8	MF	NIR	Adamh Towe
9	FW	NIR	Conor Falls
10	FW	NIR	Eamon Fyfe
11	FW	GIB	Liam Jessop
12	DF	SCO	Rhys Breen
14	FW	NIR	Benji Wells
17	FW	IRL	Sean O’Mahony
18	DF	NIR	Aaron Traynor

No.	Pos.	Nation	Player
19	FW	NIR	James Teelan
20	FW	IRL	Ahu Obhakhan
22	MF	NIR	Jack Scott
23	DF	SCO	Michael Hewitt
26	MF	NIR	Gary Thompson (Captain)
28	MF	NIR	Ben Kennedy
29	DF	NIR	Oisin Gamble
30	DF	NIR	Denis Hudak
31	MF	NIR	Zac Creighton
32	DF	NIR	Rhys Adams
33	GK	IRL	Jamie Barry
34	MF	ENG	Finn Flanagan (On loan from Mansfield Town u23s)
48	MF	POR	Dominic Dos Santos Martins
60	GK	NIR	James Wright

=== On loan ===
Note: Flags indicate national team as defined under FIFA eligibility rules; some limited exceptions apply. Players may hold more than one non-FIFA nationality.

No.	Pos.	Nation	Player

=== Team captains ===
- Jimmy Dykes, 1947–1948
- Charles Maxwell, 1948–1950
- Tommy Andrews, 1950–1952
- Jimmy Mulvaney, 1952–1953
- Bobby Wishart, 1953–1954
- Ray Barr, 1954–1955
- Freddie Gorman, 1955–1956
- George Casement, 1956–1960
- Wilbur Cush, 1960–1966
- Jim Conway, 1960–1969
- Bill Hainey, 1969–1970
- Sammy Lunn, 1970–1971
- Jackie Hutton, 1971–1973
- Terry Kingon, 1973–1976
- John Keatley, 1976–1977
- Sammy Lunn, 1977–1978
- Ian Donegan, 1978–1979
- Jim Cleary, 1979–1980
- Jim Smyth, 1980–1982
- Ronnie Cromie, 1982–1983
- Dessie Edgar, 1983–1985
- John McKee, 1985–1986
- Frankie Parks, 1986–1987
- Tom Connell, 1987–1989
- Brian Strain, 1989–2000
- Vinny Arkins, 2000–2006
- John Convery, 2006–2010
- Keith O’Hara, 2010–2017
- Niall Henderson, 2017–2018
- Luke Wilson, 2018–2020
- Patrick McNally, 2020–2023
- Gary Thompson, 2023-

== Managerial history ==
Ronnie McFall is the clubs longest serving and most successful manager, managing the club between 1986 and 2016.

Dates	Names	Notes
1947–1948	(Northern Ireland) Tom Sloan	
1948–1949	(Northern Ireland) Tommy Lipton	
1949–1951	(Scotland) Hugh Bulloch	
1952-1953	(Wales) Dai Hopkins	
1953–1954	(Northern Ireland) Willie Ross	
1954-1955	(Northern Ireland) Billy Cook	
1955–1957	(Northern Ireland) Harry Walker	
1957–1963	(Scotland) Gibby Mackenzie	"The famous fast talking Scot" grew a reputation as a much loved figure at Shamrock Park in his time at the club.
1963–1965	(Northern Ireland) Wilbur Cush	The legendary international had a spell as manager at Shamrock Park in the early sixties.
1965-1966	(Northern Ireland) Charlie Tully	
1966–1968	(Scotland) Jim Conway	Conway's first spell was just a year long one before taking charge again in a two-year spell.
1968-1977	(Scotland) Gibby Mackenzie	Mackenzie came back for his second spell in charge becoming one of the club's most loyal managers the highlight was coming so close to winning the club's first ever league title in 1976.
1977–1979	(Northern Ireland) Bertie Neil	Neil was appointed as Mackenzies replacement with the highlight of his reign being a Gold Cup win and an Irish Cup final appearance.
1979–1983	(Scotland) Jackie Hutton	Scot Hutton was at the helm for four years winning several honours in the process.
1983-1985	(Northern Ireland) John Flanagan	Flanagan took charge for a brief spell in the mid eighties.
1986	(Northern Ireland) Billy McClatchey (Interim)	Ex Glenavon boss McClatchey took charge of the Ports for 6 games prior to Kingon taking over.
1985-1986	(Northern Ireland) Terry Kingon	Kingon had a brief unsuccessful time in charge at the helm being sacked after one year.
1986–2016	(Northern Ireland) Ronnie McFall	McFall was appointed as Ports boss in December 1986. Under McFall, the Ports won their first ever league title in 1990. The club would win an unprecedented league and cup double in 91, with further league title wins coming in 96 and 2002, and an Irish Cup win in 2005. McFall would resign as manager in 2016 and is regarded as the club's greatest ever manager.
2016	(Northern Ireland) Pat McGibbon	Ex Manchester United defender Pat McGibbon was appointed as the successor to Ronnie McFall and resigned in October 2016.
2016	(Republic of Ireland) Vinny Arkins (interim)	Club legend Arkins was appointed as Interim boss for 60 days in 2016 and was a firm fan favourite.
2016–2018	(Northern Ireland) Niall Currie	Portadown native Currie was appointed on 5 December 2016 as McGibbon's replacement. Currie was sacked in February 2018 with the Ports sitting 5th in the Championship.
2018–2022	(Wales) Matthew Tipton	Former Ports striker Tipton was appointed as manager in February 2018 and left the club in January 2022 having achieved promotion back to the NIFL Premiership.
2022	(Republic of Ireland) Paul Doolin	Doolin returned to the club in January 2022 as interim manager until the end of the season. Doolin would get the job on a permanent basis, however he would leave the club in October 2022 with the Ports rooted to the foot of the table.
2022-2026	(Northern Ireland) Niall Currie	Niall Currie would make a surprise return from Dundela for his second spell in charge of the club. Unable to save the club from relegation to the NIFL Championship, he helped secure promotion back to the top flight the following season. Currie would be sacked unexepectedly in April 2026.
2026-	(Northern Ireland) David Jeffrey MBE	Linfield legend Jeffrey would make a return to football following a 3 year absence from management to Shamrock Park.

== Honours ==
=== Senior honours ===
- Irish League: 4
  - 1989–90, 1990–91, 1995–96, 2001–02
- Irish Cup: 3
  - 1990–91, 1998–99, 2004–05
- Irish League Cup: 2
  - 1995–96, 2008–09
- Charity Shield: 1
  - 1999
- NIFL Championship: 2
  - 2019–20, 2023–24
- Mid-Ulster Cup: 24
  - 1898–99, 1899–1900, 1902–03, 1903–04, 1905–06, 1907–08, 1909–10, 1931–32, 1933–34, 1946–47†, 1960–61†, 1962–63†, 1964–65†, 1969–70†, 1980–81, 1981–82, 1982–83, 1992–93, 1993–94, 1994–95, 1997–98, 2001–02, 2002–03, 2023–24
- Gold Cup: 6
  - 1933–34, 1937–38, 1952–53, 1971–72, 1978–79, 1992–93
- Ulster Cup: 2
  - 1990–91, 1995–96
- Floodlit Cup: 3
  - 1990–91, 1992–93, 1994–95
- Carlsberg Cup: 1
  - 1972–73
- Texaco Cup: 1
  - 1973–74
- City Cup: 1
  - 1938–39

=== Intermediate honours ===
- IFA Championship: 1
  - 2008–09~
- George Wilson Cup: 1
  - 1996–97†
- Bob Radcliffe Cup: 2
  - 1982–83†, 1983–84†

† Won by Portadown Reserves

~ Portadown were an intermediate side when they won the IFA Championship in 2009. From 2016 the league was awarded senior status, thus their subsequent wins in 2020 & 2024 are not considered intermediate honors.

=== Junior honours ===
- Harry Cavan Youth Cup: 3
  - 1979–80, 1991–92, 2013–14
- Mid-Ulster Youth Cup: 3
  - 2015–16, 2019–20, 2021–22
- NIFL Championship Development League South: 2
  - 2017–18, 2018–19
- Irish Junior Cup: 1
  - 1898–99

=== Friendly honours ===
- Royal Mail Community Action Cup: 2
  - 2003–04, 2004–05
- George Richardson Memorial Cup: 2
  - 2018–2019, 2019–2020
- Ivan Marshall Cup: 1
  - 2004–05

== Hall of Fame ==
Year inducted	Player	Playing position	Years at the club	Role at the club
2018	(Northern Ireland) Mickey Keenan	Goalkeeper	1981-1998 & 1999–2003	Player
2018	(Northern Ireland) Philip Major	Defender	1988-2001	Player
2018	(Northern Ireland) Alfie Stewart	Defender	1988-1998	Player
2018	(Northern Ireland) Brian Strain	Defender	1987-2001	Player
2018	(Northern Ireland) Gregg Davidson	Winger	1987-2001	Player
2019	(Northern Ireland) Joey Cunningham	Winger	1990-1995	Player
2019	(Scotland) Steve Cowan	Striker	1989-1993	Player
2019	(Scotland) Sandy Fraser	Striker	1989-1995	Player
2022	(Republic of Ireland) Vinny Arkins	Striker	1997-2006 & 2016	Player & Manager
2022	(Northern Ireland) Davy Mills	Midfielder	1987-1994	Player
2022	(Northern Ireland) Kevin McKeever	Defender	1987-1993	Player
2022	(Republic of Ireland) Paul Doolin	Midfielder	1990–91, 1994–95 and 2022	Player & Manager
