= Carrick Rangers F.C. =

Association football club in Northern Ireland

Coordinates: 54°43′11.0058″N 5°48′0.867″W

Carrick Rangers
- Full name: Carrick Rangers Football Club
- Nicknames: Amber Army; The 'Gers
- Founded: 1939; 87 years ago
- Ground: Taylors Avenue, Carrickfergus
- Capacity: 1,500
- Owner: Michael Smith
- Chairman: Peter Clarke
- Manager: Stephen Baxter
- League: NIFL Premiership
- 2025–26: NIFL Premiership, 7th of 12
- Website: www.carrickrangers.co.uk
Home colours	Away colours

Carrick Rangers Football Club is a semi-professional Northern Irish football club playing in NIFL Premiership. The club, founded in 1939, is based in Carrickfergus, County Antrim, and plays its home matches at Taylors Avenue. Carrick Rangers main rivals are Larne, with matches between the sides being known as, "The East Antrim Derby." Ballyclare Comrades are also local rivals.

== History ==
The club was formed in 1939, when two teams from the Carrickfergus & District Summer League – Barn Mills and Bubbles decided to merge. In 1940, the new club joined the Belfast Minor League and took up residence at Taylors Avenue, then known as the Barn Field They won the County Antrim Junior Shield in 1941–42 and in 1943 gained admission to the Northern Amateur League, of which they were the champions in 1948–49 and 1951–52. 1952 saw the club's elevation to the Intermediate League, necessary ground improvements being made at the Barn Field, now known as Taylors Avenue, and then, following the demise of that competition, to the Irish Alliance in 1954 and eventually the Irish League B Division in 1957. As members of the Alliance, Carrick won the McKelvey Cup, a knock-out cup for league members, in 1956–57.

From 1983 until 2003, the club enjoyed senior status, but reverted to intermediate status when the Irish Premier League was established and the number of senior clubs was reduced from 20 to 16. The club's greatest achievement was winning the Irish Cup in 1976, when, as a B Division team they beat Linfield in the final in one of the greatest cup shocks.

On 2 May 2011, the club secured a return to top flight football for the first time since the 1994–95 season, after being crowned champions of Championship 1. However, they were unable to adapt to the step up in quality and lasted only one season in the top flight, finishing the 2011–12 IFA Premiership in last place which resulted in relegation back down to Championship 1 for the 2012–13 season.

On 25 April 2015, Carrick sealed promotion back to the Premiership as champions following a 1–0 win over Dundela.

In the 2015–16 season they performed reasonably well in their first season back in the Premiership for three years winning significantly against the likes of Dungannon Swifts back to back and also on the first day of the season, an incredible 4–3 home victory over champions Crusaders and got draws with Glenavon, Portadown and Linfield. They secured their survival in the NIFL Premiership on the last day of the season after two late goals from Mark Surgeoner and Miguel Chines against Ballinamallard; Miguel's goal coming in the 90+3-minute after an incredible acrobatic effort to keep the 'Gers up.

The following season manager Gary Haveron left the club and the Gers appointed former Portadown long time assistant to Ronnie McFall Kieran Harding. Hardings reign was an unsuccessful one with the Amber Army's only win coming at a 1–0 win over a struggling Glentoran with the 'Gers losing comfortably most weeks and struggling for any sort of form, most notably losing 4–1 to Ballymena United, losing 4–0 to fellow strugglers Portadown team and 3–0 at home to Dungannon Swifts with Hardings resignation following. The club appointed former Crusaders and Bohemians manager Aaron Callaghan as Hardings replacement. A small upturn in form begun with Callaghan getting more favourable results and improving steadily. The Gers reached to League Cup Final in 2017 after beating Glenavon 1–0 at Mourneview Park but lost 2–0 to David Jeffrey's Ballymena United at Seaview on 18 February 2017. Following the cup final, positive results were rare, with the club falling further behind their rivals and starting to come dangerously close to basement team Portadown. Carrick eventually finished 11th and faced a relegation/promotion playoff against championship runners up Institute, which they convincingly won 5–2 on aggregate over the two legs. Following the resignation of Aaron Callaghan after the final game of the regular season, former Larne manager and Cliftonville player David McAlinden was appointed.

Another poor season led the team to 11th in the table; this was followed up by a 6-3 aggregate loss to Newry City in the play offs, which of course meant relegation to the championship. Former Loughgall, Ards and Portadown manager Niall Currie then took over for the 2018–19 season.

Currie's side finished second in the Championship in the 2018–19 season behind runaway leaders Larne. This earned them a place in the Promotion play-off, first against third-place finishers Portadown, with the winner earning the right to face Ards, who finished 11th in the Premiership. After beating Portadown in the first round, Currie's side went on to beat former side Ards 3-1 on aggregate over two legs to earn promotion back to the top tier.

In December 2019, defender Jerry Thompson committed suicide, aged 24. Tributes flooded in from all areas of the Northern Irish football community and prompted mourning for all in the local game. Following the tragedy, Carrick announced that the number 21 shirt would be retired in his memory.

Currie left the club in May 2021, not specifying a reason behind his resignation, with there being a belief from some of a form of disagreement with the clubs board.

The club appointed former Linfield winger Stuart King as his replacement, who had a successful spell managing NIFL Premier Intermediate League side Banbridge Town. King oversaw Carrick avoiding relegation from the NIFL Premiership in the 2021–22 season, his first in charge. The 2022–23 season saw Carrick secure a commendable place of eighth. King guided Carrick to a seventh-place finish in 2023–24, displaying consistent growth and development. In the relegation group of the split, Carrick won four out of their five games. After an opening day win in the NIFL Premiership, Carrick sat bottom of the table after eight league defeats in a row. On the 1st October 2024 Carrick parted company with Stuart King following a 1–0 defeat by Queen's University in the BetMcLean League Cup. The defeat by third-tier Queen's University, who hit a late winner through Chris Middleton at Taylors Avenue, was to be King's final match in charge.

On the 7th October 2024 Carrick appointed 59 year old veteran manager Stephen Baxter to take over as the first team manager on a 3-year contract. Baxter called time to his successful 19-year reign of Crusaders at the 2023/2024 season winning 17 honours as manager of The Crues including 3 NIFL Premierships, 4 Irish Cups & 1 Irish League Cup. Baxter boasted an impressive honour currently placing 16th on the List of longest managerial reigns in association football post war during his 19-year tenure of The Crues.

Baxters first game in charge of Carrick was an impressive 2–1 home victory against Colerain followed up by a 1–1 draw away to high flying Glentoran. A mix set of results followed and Carrick finished the 2024/2025 season in 11th position with their top flight status to be decided in a relegation playoff tie with promotion chasing Annagh United from the NIFL Championship. Carrick ran out 5–2 victors in the first leg away from home thanks to a first half hat trick from striker Danny Gibson and a 2 goals from veteran playmaker Paul Heatley. In the second leg at Loughview Leisure Arena, Taylors Avenue Carrick secured survival with a 3–1 victory (8-3 agg) thanks to two more goals from Heatley & one from Gibson. The 2024/2025 season saw Carrick knocked out of the BetMcLean League Cup in round 1 by Queen's University whilst reaching the Quarter Final of the Irish Cup to be knocked out by eventual winners Dungannon Swifts 3–1 at home. Carrick also reached the Quarter Final of the County Antrim Shield losing to eventual winners Glentoran 2–0 at The Oval.

The 2025–26 season was a successful campaign for Carrick, with the club competing in the NIFL Premiership, Irish Cup, BetMcLean League Cup and County Antrim Shield. Carrick began the league season strongly, recording notable victories over Crusaders and Glenavon. Another notable victory was a 3–2 away victory in the East Antrim Derby against eventual champions Larne and remained competitive throughout the campaign. The club finished the Premiership regular season in seventh place with a club record points total of 53 points, securing a place in the European play-offs. Carrick subsequently defeated Glenavon 3–2 on the final day of the league season, before losing 3–1 to Dungannon Swifts in the European play-off semi-final. The season's major achievement came in the County Antrim Shield. Carrick defeated Bangor, Glentoran and Larne before overcoming Cliftonville on penalties in the final to win the competition. It was a significant cup success for the club, ending a 33-year wait for a senior trophy and marking Carrick Rangers' second County Antrim Shield triumph. In the Irish Cup, Carrick defeated Queen's University 5–1 in the fifth round before being eliminated by Colerain in the last 16 after extra time. The club also exited the BetMcLean League Cup in the first round, losing 3–2 to Armagh City. Across all competitions, Carrick Rangers played 46 matches, recording 20 wins, 8 draws and 18 defeats, scoring 91 goals. Danny Gibson was the club's leading scorer with 20 goals, while Adam Lecky and Paul Heatley also reached double figures.

== New ownership ==
In 2023, the club was acquired by American businessman Michael Smith. Smith, originally from Portland, Oregon, was the Chief Information Officer of Estée Lauder Companies. Smith was quoted as saying, "I am thrilled to join the Carrick Rangers organization and be a part of the Club's continued ascension."

== European record ==
Having qualified for the 1976–77 European Cup Winners' Cup, the club very creditably defeated Aris Bonnevoie of Luxembourg 4–3 on aggregate in the first round, before going out 9–3 on aggregate to English club Southampton in the second round.

Season	Competition	Round	Opponent	Home	Away	Aggregate
1976–77	European Cup Winners' Cup	1R	(Luxembourg) Aris	3–1	1–2	4–3
1976–77	European Cup Winners' Cup	2R	(England) Southampton	2–5	1–4	3–9

== Current squad ==
Note: Flags indicate national team as defined under FIFA eligibility rules; some limited exceptions apply. Players may hold more than one non-FIFA nationality.

No.	Pos.	Nation	Player
1	GK	NIR	Nathan Gartside
2	DF	IRL	Michael Place
4	DF	NIR	Billy Joe Burns
5	DF	NIR	Jordan Forsythe
6	DF	NIR	Jimmy Callacher
7	FW	IRL	Daire O'Connor
8	MF	NIR	Seanan Clucas
9	FW	NIR	Danny Gibson
10	FW	NIR	Adam Lecky
11	FW	LTU	Nedas Maciulaitis
12	DF	NIR	Luke McCullough
13	GK	NIR	Scott Pengelly
14	MF	NIR	Aidan Steele
15	DF	NIR	Ben Buchanan-Rolleston

No.	Pos.	Nation	Player
16	MF	IRL	Ethan Boyle
17	FW	SCO	Joe Moore
18	FW	NIR	Jack Boyd
19	MF	NIR	Joe Crowe
20	MF	NIR	Kyle Cherry
22	MF	NIR	Paul Heatley
23	FW	NIR	Jack Hastings
24	MF	NIR	Matthew Snoddy
25	GK	NIR	Dylan Agnew
27	FW	NIR	Codey James
28	FW	NIR	Daniel Grills
32	DF	NIR	Darrin Hill =

== Retired numbers ==
21 - In honour of former player Jerry Thompson who died suddenly in December 2019.

== Honours ==
=== Senior honours ===
- Irish Cup: 1
  - 1975–76
- County Antrim Shield: 2
  - 1992–93, 2025–26

=== Intermediate honours ===
- Irish League B Division/IFA Championship 1/NIFL Championship 1: 8 (inc. one shared)
  - 1961–62, 1972–73, 1974–75, 1976–77 (shared), 1978–79, 1982–83, 2010–11, 2014–15
- Irish Intermediate Cup: 4
  - 1975–76, 1976–77, 2010–11, 2014–15
- Intermediate League Cup: 1
  - 2003–04
- Steel & Sons Cup: 3
  - 1961–62, 1967–68, 2014–15
- Louis Moore Cup: 2
  - 1963–64, 1969–70
- Northern Amateur Football League: 2
  - 1948–49, 1951–52

=== Junior honours ===
- Minor League: 1
  - 1941–42
- County Antrim Junior Shield: 1
  - 1941–42
