= Omagh Town F.C. =

Omagh Town
- Full name: Omagh Town Football and Athletic Club
- Founded: 1962
- Dissolved: 2005
- Ground: St Julian's Road, Omagh, County Tyrone
- Capacity: 5,000
- League: Northern Irish Premier League
- 2004–05: 16th (relegated)
Home colours	Away colours

Omagh Town Football Club is a Northern Irish association football club that is based in Omagh, County Tyrone. Founded in 1962, the club played in the Northern Irish Football League from 1990 until its closure in 2005. They won the North West Senior Cup on six occasions and competed in the UEFA Intertoto Cup twice, in 1998 and 2003. Omagh Town was dissolved on 7 June 2005, owing to financial problems. In 2024 the club was initially relaunched with youth teams and in 2025 launched a senior team with the hope of securing promotion back to the Irish Premiership.

== History ==
Omagh Town Football and Athletic Club was formed in August 1962 by Aines McGeehan, who wanted to start a team for young players from the Derry Road area of the town of Omagh. The team was called Omagh Celtic Football Club and started off with maroon shirts with blue shorts. The team (both Catholic and Protestant) played at Quarry Field Mullaghmena in Omagh.

In 1969, the club changed its name to Omagh Town Football and Athletic Club and also changed their accommodation to the Military Holm for three years, moving to The Showgrounds afterwards. Following 1974 the kit also changed again, this time to white shirts and black shorts. This combination would change several more time before the club finally settled on a combination of red, black, and white.

In 1990, Omagh Town moved to St Julian's Road, a site that was previously a council dump. Omagh leased the land and developed a football stadium. The stadium had a natural grass pitch, with a capacity of 5000 with 30 VIP places, 250 covered seats, 3220 covered standing places and 1500 uncovered standing places.

Supporters of Omagh Town called the club "The Town". The club also supported darts, women's football and poolmembers. In total the club had about 470 members, of which 180 were youth members. Support for the club derived mainly from the towns of Omagh, Castlederg, Dromore and Ballygawley. Omagh Town's main rivalry was with north-west derby rivals Coleraine as well as with Glentoran.

The club were elected to senior football (the Irish League) for the first time in the 1990–91 season, and would remain in the top flight for the next five years. In 1994–95, a change in makeup of the league, dropping the number of teams in the top flight to 8, caused Omagh to be relegated after finishing 9th. The results and points accumulated over two seasons were taken into account. Roy McCreadie's departure had caused problems, Paul Kee was left in charge. McCreadie returned and Town were promoted again, coming in as runners-up to Ballymena in the first division.

After losing in the 1997–98 Irish cup semi-final with one of the best squads assembled, money worries forced the departure of the bulk of that side. Indeed, the addition of a couple of key players could have seen Omagh challenge for the following seasons premiership. Instead, a weakened squad struggled and were relegated at the end of the 1998–99 season. However, a tremendous 1999–2000 campaign in the first division saw Omagh under Roy McCreadie promoted as champions, Eamon Kavanagh collecting the cup at St Julian's Road despite a loss to Limavady. Omagh would remain in the Premier Division for the next two years finishing 9th and 10th, respectively. Roy McCreadie's departure left a void Town could not fill. Frankie Wilson and Eamon Kavanagh were caretaker managers for a time but rather than give them the job, Former Derry City star Johnny Speak took over. He failed to settle in the role and although guiding Town to another Irish cup semi-final (another loss) he was replaced by Paul Kee and John Cunningham.

Since the 2000–01 season Omagh Town had been in the Premier Division, but continued to suffer from a lack of support and poor attendances. Behind the scenes there had been numerous talks of takeovers and rescue plans for several years, none really materialised to any degree. In 2004, links with the local soccer school were formalised and several key members of that group and members of the business and political sectors got involved. The influx of interest had little effect though and after relegation at the end of the 2004–05 season the future looked bleak.

On 7 June 2005, the club announced, hastily it may be argued, that it had folded after failing to overcome financial problems. Omagh was already struggling financially before the team was relegated from the Irish Premier League in April. The club said the drop from the top flight and the recent closure of its social club were the two major factors behind the decision to fold.

In 2024, former Loughgall footballer Caolan McAleer announced plans to relaunch the club, initially competing in underage football structures in the area, before then restarting a senior first team, with ambitions of taking the club back to its former glory of the NIFL Premiership.

== European record ==
Season	Competition	Round	Opponent	Home	Away	Aggregate
1998	UEFA Intertoto Cup	1R	(Slovakia) Rimavská Sobota	2–2	0–1	2–3
2003	UEFA Intertoto Cup	1R	(Belarus) Shakhtyor Soligorsk	1–7	0–1	1–8

== Honours ==
=== Senior honours ===
- Floodlit Cup: 1
  - 1991–92
- Irish League First Division: 1
  - 1999–00
- North West Senior Cup: 6
  - 1990–91, 1992–93, 1995–96, 1996–97, 1999–00, 2000–01
- Irish News Cup: 1
  - 1997–98

=== Intermediate honours ===
- B Division Knock-out Cup: 1
  - 1989–90
