= List of association football clubs in Northern Ireland =

This is a list of football clubs that compete within the leagues and divisions of the men's Northern Ireland football league system.

== NIFL Premiership ==
Club	Stadium	Location	Capacity	Finishing position in 2024-25
Ballymena United	Ballymena Showgrounds	Ballymena	3,600	9th
Bangor	Clandeboye Park	Bangor	2,850	1st (Promoted from NIFL Championship)
Carrick Rangers	Loughshore Hotel Arena	Carrickfergus	1,500	11th
Cliftonville	Solitude	Belfast	2,530	7th
Coleraine	The Showgrounds	Coleraine	2,496	6th
Crusaders	Seaview	Belfast	3,383	5th
Dungannon Swifts	Stangmore Park	Dungannon	2,000(300 seated)	4th
Glenavon	Mourneview Park	Lurgan	4,160	10th
Glentoran	The Oval	Belfast	6,050	3rd
Larne	Inver Park	Larne	3,250	2nd
Linfield	Windsor Park	Belfast	18,614	1st (League winners)
Portadown	Shamrock Park	Portadown	2,770	8th

== NIFL Championship ==
Club	Stadium	Location	Capacity
Annagh United	BMG Arena	Portadown	1,250 (100 seated)
Ards	Bangor Fuels Arena	Bangor	1,895 (500 seated)
Ballinamallard United	Ferney Park	Ballinamallard	2,000 (250 seated)
Ballyclare Comrades	Dixon Park	Ballyclare	2,400
Bangor	Bangor Fuels Arena	Bangor	1,895
Dergview	Darragh Park	Castlederg	1,200
Dundela	Wilgar Park	Belfast	1,200
Harland & Wolff Welders	Blanchflower Stadium	Belfast	1,100
Institute	Ryan McBride Brandywell Stadium	Derry	3,700
Knockbreda	Breda Park	Belfast	1,000
Newington	Inver Park	Larne	3,000
Newry City	The Showgrounds	Newry	7,949

== NIFL Premier Intermediate League ==
Club	Stadium	Location	Capacity
Ballymacash Rangers	The Bluebell Stadium	Lisburn	1,280
Banbridge Town	Crystal Park	Banbridge	1,500
Coagh United	Hagan Park	Coagh	1,000 (150 seated)
Dergview	Darragh Park	Castlederg	1,280
Dollingstown	Planter's Park	Dollingstown	1,000
Dergview	Darragh Park	Castlederg	1,280
Knockbreda	Breda Park	Belfast	
Oxford Sunnyside	Knockramer Park	Lurgan	1,600
Knockbreda	Breda Park	Belfast	
Portstewart	Mullaghacall	Portstewart	1,000
Queen's University	Upper Malone	Belfast	1,000 (330 seated)
Rathfriland Rangers	Iveagh Park	Rathfriland	
Tobermore United	Fortwilliam Park	Tobermore	2,000 (100 seated)
Warrenpoint Town	Milltown	Warrenpoint	1,450

== League of Ireland Premier Division ==
- Derry City

== Mid-Ulster Football League ==
Intermediate A

- Banbridge Rangers
- Bourneview Mill
- Crewe United
- Fivemiletown United
- Lurgan Town
- Moneyslane
- Newmills
- [Psni
- Richhill
- Seagoe
- St Mary's
- Tandragee Rovers
- Valley Rangers
- Windmill Stars

Intermediate B

- AFC Craigavon
- Ambassadors
- Craigavon City
- Dromore Amateurs
- Dungannon Tigers
- Hanover
- Laurelvale
- Lower Maze
- Markethill Swifts
- Portadown BBOB
- Rectory Rangers
- Seapatrick
- Tullyvallen

Division 1

- Annalong
- Ballyoran
- Ballyvea
- Caledon Rovers
- Coalisland Athletic
- FC Mindwell
- Goodyear
- Hill Street
- Hillsborough Boys
- Lurgan Celtic
- Sandy Hill

Division 2

- Armagh Blues
- Armagh Celtic
- Bessbrook United
- Donacloney
- Gilford Crusaders
- Glenavy Youth
- Keady Celtic
- Lurgan BBOB
- Red Star
- Roca Juniors
- The Dons
- Tollymore United
- West End Hibs

Division 3

- Broomhedge Maghaberry
- Castlecaulfield
- Damolly
- Dungannon Rovers
- Dunnaman
- Glenavy
- FC United Lisburn
- Lisburn Youth
- Magheralin Village
- Moira Albion
- Riverdale
- Sands United ABC
- Warren Young Men

== Ballymena & Provincial League ==
Intermediate Division 1

- Ballymoney United
- Belfast Celtic
- Dunloy
- Desertmartin
- Newtowne
- Newbuildings United
- St James Swifts
- Strabane Athletic
- Wellington Rec
- Wakehurst

Intermediate Division 2

- Ballynure Old Boys
- Brantwood
- Chimney Corner
- Maiden City
- Heights
- Glebe Rangers
- Cookstown Youth
- Killymoon Rangers
- Rathcoole
- Inspired Community

== Northern Ireland Intermediate League ==
- Ardstraw
- Ballymoney United
- Dungiven Celtic
- Newbuildings United
- Oxford United Stars
- Strabane Athletic
- Trojans

== Northern Amateur Football League ==
Premier Division

- Abbey Villa
- Ards Rangers
- Comber Recreation
- Crumlin Star
- Derriaghy Cricket Club
- Drumaness Mills
- Dromara Village
- East Belfast
- Lisburn Rangers
- Immaculata
- Islandmagee
- Rosario Youth
- Mossley
- Kilmore Recreation
Division 2A
- 22nd Old Boys
- Bangor Swifts
- Bangor Y.M.
- Beann Mhádagháin FC
- Belfast Celtic YM
- Donaghadee F.C.
- Ford F.C.
- Kelvin Old Boys
- Queens Grads.
- St Mary's
- St Teresas Y.C.
- Taughmonagh YM FC

Division 1A

- 1st Bangor Old Boys
- Albert Foundry
- Aquinas
- Crumlin United
- Dunmurry Recreation
- Dunmurry Young Men
- Finaghy
- Holywood
- Larne Technical Old Boys
- Shankill United
- Sirocco Works
- St Oliver Plunkett
- Rosemount Rec
- Willowbank
Division 2B
- 4th Newtownabbey F.C.
- Carryduff Colts
- Celtic Bhoys
- Clonduff FC
- Lower Shankill FC
- NI Civil Service F.C.
- Newhill FC
- Newtownbreda F.C.
- Queens University 11's
- Ravenhill YM FC
- St Patricks Y.M. F.C.
- Tullymore Swifts
- Ulster University

Division 1B

- Bangor Amateurs
- Bryansburn Rangers
- Ballynahinch Olympic
- Colin Valley
- Downshire Young Men
- Dundonald
- Greenisland
- Newcastle
- 18th Newtownabbey Old Boys
- Portaferry Rovers
- Shamrock
- St Luke's
- St Matthews
- Killyleagh Youth
Division 2C
- Antrim Rovers
- Ballysillan Swifts
- Belvoir FC II
- Clonard FC II
- Cregagh Wanderers FC
- Cumann Spóirt an Phobail
- Greenwell Star FC
- Groomsport
- Kircubbin F.C.
- Rooftop
- Réalta naCromóige
- Sandy Row
- St Malachys OB Youth FC
- Whitehead Eagles

Division 1C

- Barn United
- Ballynahinch United
- Ballywalter Recreation
- Bangor Swifts
- Bloomfield
- Grove United
- Orangefield Old Boys
- Portavogie Rangers
- Malachians
- Saintfield United
- Shorts
- Suffolk
- Tullycarnet
- Woodvale
Division 3 - reserve teams

== North-West Junior League ==
Premier Division

- Ardmore
- Ballykelly
- Boys Brigade Old Boys
- Caw
- City Colts
- Drummond
- Eglinton
- Lincoln Court
- Newbuildings United Reserves
- Tullyalley

Division 1

- Burnfoot
- Churchill United
- Claudy Rovers
- Donemana
- Douglas Bridge
- Dungiven Celtic Reserves
- Foyle Wanderers
- Irish Street
- Roe Rovers Reserves

Division 2

- Ardmore Reserves
- Artigarvan
- Boys Brigade Old Boys Reserves
- Claudy United
- Donemana Reserves
- Dungiven Celtic 3rd's
- Dromore
- Eglinton Reserves
- Glendermott
- Limavady Rugby Football Club
- Lincon Court Reserves

== Derry and District League ==
=== Northwest Saturday Morning League ===
Premier Division

- Cliftonvilla
- Phoenix Swifts
- Brandywell Celtic
- Bohemians
- Mourne Harps
- Newton Heath
- Magee College
- Cloony YC
- Gransha
- Corinthians

First Division

- Westbank United
- Tamnaherin Celtic
- Du Pont
- Abercorn
- Oxford Utd
- Foyle Harps
- Benbradagh Colts
- St. Columb's College
- Northside Albion
- Foyle Athletic
- Drumahoe YCMA
- West Galliagh

=== Senior Sunday Morning League ===
Premier Division

- Oxford United Reserves
- Don Bosco's
- Top of the Hill Celtic
- Derry Rovers
- Lisahally
- Abercorn
- Porters
- Metro
- Brandywell Harps
- Celtic Swifts
- Three Flowers
- The720
- Bluebell Celtic

First Division

- Oxford Colts
- Bogside Inn
- Don Bosco's Youths
- Downey's
- Carraig Bar
- City Harps
- Culmore
- Tristar Boys
- Phoenix
- Crescent
- Currynierin
- Maydown
- St Helens FC

== Coleraine and District League ==
Premier Division

- Ballymoney United Reserves
- Balnamore
- Coleraine Crusaders
- Dervock
- Dunloy
- Glebe Rangers Reserves
- Kilrea United
- Maghera Strollers
- Portrush
- Tullans Red Star

Morning Championship

- Ballybrakes United
- Borbury
- Bushmills United
- Coina Rovers
- Draperstown Celtic Reserves
- Heights Reserves
- Macosquin
- Newtowne Reserves
- Portrush Reserves
- Portstewart Olympic
- Riada

Morning Division One

- Aghadowey
- Articlave
- Ballymoney Swifts
- Cookstown RBL Swifts
- Dervock Reserves
- Dunaghy
- East End
- Garvagh
- Killowen
- Magherafelt Reds
- Upperlands

== Fermanagh & Western League ==
Division 1

- Beragh Swifts
- Dergview Reserves
- Derrychara United
- Enniskillen Athletic
- Enniskillen Rangers
- Enniskillen Town United
- Killen Rangers
- Lisbellaw United
- Magheraveely
- Mountfield
- Mountjoy United
- NFC Kesh
- Strathroy Harps
- Tummery Athletic

Division 2

- Augher Stars
- Castlederg United
- Enniskillen Galaxy
- Fintona Swifts
- Irvinestown Wanderers
- Lisnarick
- Maguiresbridge
- Omagh Hospitals
- Orchard Farm

Division 3

- Ardstraw
- Dunbreen Rovers
- Drumquin United
- Enniskillen Rovers
- Fivemiletown United II
- Lisnaskea Rovers
- Newtownstewart United
- Omagh Albion
- St Patricks

== Down Area Winter Football League ==
Premier Division
- Ards Rangers Colts
- Ballynafeigh Breda Star
- Blackstaff
- Castle Juniors
- Comber Rec III
- Comber YM
- Corrymeela
- Millisle
- Newtownards RBL
- North Down
- Victoria Athletic
- Vision Athletic
Division 1
- 43rd Dundonald
- Abbey Villa Development Team
- Ballygowan
- Ballyhalbert United
- Bangor YM III
- Bloomfield III
- Cooke Athletic
- Holywood III
- Lagan Swifts
- Newtown Forest
- Willowfield Parish 10th OB
- Moat Park Rangers
Division 2
- 3rd Bangor
- Bryansburn Rangers III
- Carryduff Colts III
- Clarawood
- Cloughey FC
- East Belfast III
- Groomsport III
- Queens Grads III
- Ravenhill YM II
- Tullycarnet III
Reserve 1
- 43rd Dundonald II
- Castle Juniors II
- Comber Rec IV
- Comber YM II
- Holywood IV
- Newtown Forest II
- Newtownards RBL II
- North Down II
- Victoria Athletic II
- Vision Athletic II
- Willowfield Parish 10th OB Athletic
Reserve 2
- 3rd Bangor II
- Ards Rangers Swifts
- Ballygowan II
- Ballynafeigh Breda Star II
- Blackstaff II
- Bryansburn Rangers IV
- Carryduff Colts IV
- Cloughey FC II
- Corrymeela II
- Lagan Swifts II
- Millisle II
- Queens Grads IV

== Defunct clubs ==
- Alton United
- Belfast Celtic
- Derry Celtic
- Derry Olympic
- Fisher Body F.C.
- Omagh Town
- Queen's Island
- Queen's Island 1881
- Ulster
- St Elizabeth's
- Donard Hospital
- Dungannon Rovers
- Willowfield
- Kilroot Rec
- Newry City (Refounded as Newry City AFC in 2013)

== See also ==
- List of association football competitions
- List of association football clubs in the Republic of Ireland
- List of association football clubs in Scotland
