= 2014–15 Irish Cup =

Tournament details
- Country: Northern Ireland
- Teams: 125

Final positions
- Champions: Glentoran (22nd win)
- Runners-up: Portadown

Tournament statistics
- Matches played: 124
- Goals scored: 511 (4.12 per match)

The 2014–15 Irish Cup was the 135th edition of the Irish Cup, the premier knockout cup competition in Northern Irish football since its introduction in 1881. The competition began on 23 August 2014 with the first round, and concluded on 2 May 2015 with the final. For the first time since 1995, the Oval was chosen as the final venue following the discovery of damage to a stand at Windsor Park during the stadium's redevelopment.

Glenavon were the defending champions, following their 2–1 win over Ballymena United in the 2014 final. However, this season they were eliminated in the sixth round after a shock 2–0 defeat to second-tier side Harland & Wolff Welders.

Glentoran were the eventual cup winners for the second time in three seasons and the 22nd time overall by defeating Portadown 1–0 in the final, and subsequently qualified for the 2015–16 UEFA Europa League first qualifying round.

== Format and schedule ==
125 clubs entered this season's competition, an increase of six clubs compared with the 2013–14 total of 119 clubs. Initially there had been 128 entrants, however three clubs – Draperstown Celtic, Lisanally Rangers and Mountjoy United – all withdrew after the first round draw had been made, with Lisanally Rangers later dissolving.

80 regional league clubs from tiers 4–7 in the Northern Ireland football league system entered the competition in the first round. A further 4 clubs proceeded directly into the second round; one club received a bye (necessitated by the number of participants), while the other 3 clubs had no first round matches after their opponents withdrew from the competition. These clubs contested the first three rounds, with the 11 surviving clubs joining the 29 NIFL Championship clubs in the fourth round.

The 12 NIFL Premiership clubs then entered the competition in the fifth round, along with the 20 winners from the fourth round matches. In a major change to the rules from previous seasons, replays were abolished. All ties level after 90 minutes used extra time to determine the winner, with a penalty shoot-out to follow if necessary.

| Round | Draw date | First match date | Fixtures | Clubs |
|---|---|---|---|---|
| First round | 29 July 2014 | 23 August 2014 | 40 | 125 → 85 |
| Second round | 1 September 2014 | 4 October 2014 | 22 | 85 → 63 |
| Third round | 6 October 2014 | 8 November 2014 | 11 | 63 → 52 |
| Fourth round | 10 November 2014 | 6 December 2014 | 20 | 52 → 32 |
| Fifth round | 17 December 2014 | 10 January 2015 | 16 | 32 → 16 |
| Sixth round | 10 January 2015 | 7 February 2015 | 8 | 16 → 8 |
| Quarter-finals | 7 February 2015 | 28 February 2015 | 4 | 8 → 4 |
| Semi-finals | 28 February 2015 | 21 March 2015 | 2 | 4 → 2 |
| Final | | 2 May 2015 | 1 | 2 → 1 |

== Results ==
The league tier of each club at the time of entering the competition is listed in parentheses.

=== First round ===
The draw for the first round was made on 29 July 2014 with the matches played on 23 August 2014. Markethill Swifts received a bye into the second round. After the draw was made, Draperstown Celtic, Lisanally Rangers and Mountjoy United withdrew, and their first round opponents subsequently proceeded to the second round.

Note: All entrants at this stage were at regional level (tiers 4–7).

| Team 1 | Score | Team 2 |
|---|---|---|
| Abbey Villa (4) | walkover | Lisanally Rangers (4) (withdrew) |
| Albert Foundry (4) | 1–0 | Portaferry Rovers (6) |
| Ardglass (4) | 4–3 (aet) | Fivemiletown United (4) |
| Ards Rangers (4) | 3–2 | Islandmagee (4) |
| Ballymacash Rangers (4) | 2–1 | Dromara Village (5) |
| Ballynahinch Olympic (6) | 3–1 | Grove United (6) |
| Ballynahinch United (6) | 2–3 (aet) | Lisburn Rangers (5) |
| Ballywalter Recreation (6) | 2–0 | Bryansburn Rangers (7) |
| Banbridge Rangers (4) | walkover | Draperstown Celtic (4) (withdrew) |
| Bangor Amateurs (7) | 2–1 | Dundonald (5) |
| Chimney Corner (4) | 2–3 (aet) | Malachians (4) |
| Comber Recreation (4) | 1–2 | Hanover (5) |
| Crewe United (4) | 0–7 | St Mary's (4) |
| Crumlin Star (4) | 2–1 | Larne Technical Old Boys (5) |
| Crumlin United (5) | 5–1 | Orangefield Old Boys (5) |
| Derriaghy Cricket Club (4) | 3–1 | Newcastle (6) |
| Drumaness Mills (4) | 2–1 | Downshire Young Men (6) |
| Dungiven Celtic (4) | 0–1 | Donard Hospital (7) |
| Dunloy (4) | 2–0 | Ballysillan Swifts (4) |
| Dunmurry Recreation (5) | 3–0 | Downpatrick (5) |
| East Belfast (6) | 3–2 | Lower Maze (4) |
| Groomsport (7) | 0–4 | 1st Bangor Old Boys (6) |
| Holywood (7) | walkover | Mountjoy United (4) (withdrew) |
| Immaculata (4) | 2–0 | St Patrick's Young Men (5) |
| Killyleagh Youth (4) | 2–2 (aet) (3–2 p) | Barn United (5) |
| Killymoon Rangers (4) | 2–5 (aet) | Newtowne (4) |
| Kilmore Recreation (4) | 2–5 | Brantwood (4) |
| Kilroot Recreation (7) | 0–8 | Sirocco Works (6) |
| Lurgan Town (5) | 2–3 (aet) | UUJ (5) |
| Magherafelt Sky Blues (4) | 4–2 | Dromore Amateurs (7) |
| Moneyslane (5) | 1–4 | Colin Valley (7) |
| Newbuildings United (4) | 1–3 | Desertmartin (4) |
| Nortel (4) | 2–2 (aet) (2–3 p) | Shankill United (4) |
| Oxford Sunnyside (5) | 1–3 | Ardstraw (4) |
| Rathfern Rangers (6) | 3–1 | Iveagh United (7) |
| Rathfriland Rangers (5) | 4–0 | Seagoe (5) |
| Richhill (5) | 0–2 | Oxford United Stars (4) |
| Roe Rovers (4) | 1–3 (aet) | Broomhill (4) |
| Saintfield United (7) | 2–2 (aet) (8–9 p) | Shorts (7) |
| Strabane Athletic (4) | 1–4 (aet) | Newry City (4) |
| Tandragee Rovers (4) | 4–1 | Dunmurry Young Men (6) |
| Valley Rangers (5) | 2–3 | Bloomfield (6) |
| Wellington Recreation (6) | 3–2 (aet) | Ballynure Old Boys (4) |

Source: irishfa.com

=== Second round ===
The draw for the second round took place on 1 September 2014, with the matches played on 4 October 2014. The 40 winners from the first round matches entered this round, along with Abbey Villa, Banbridge Rangers, Holywood and Markethill Swifts.

Note: All entrants at this stage were at regional level (tiers 4–7).

| Team 1 | Score | Team 2 |
|---|---|---|
| 1st Bangor Old Boys (6) | 2–0 | Colin Valley (7) |
| Abbey Villa (4) | 2–0 | Ardstraw (4) |
| Ardglass (4) | 2–4 | Ards Rangers (4) |
| Ballynahinch Olympic (6) | 2–2 (aet) (2–3 p) | Immaculata (4) |
| Ballywalter Recreation (6) | 4–5 | Shankill United (4) |
| Banbridge Rangers (4) | 4–3 (aet) | Shorts (7) |
| Bloomfield (6) | 2–3 | St Mary's (4) |
| Brantwood (4) | 4–2 | Bangor Amateurs (7) |
| Crumlin United (5) | 7–0 | Broomhill (4) |
| Derriaghy Cricket Club (4) | 3–2 | Holywood (7) |
| Desertmartin (4) | 1–3 | Newtowne (4) |
| Dunmurry Recreation (5) | 0–2 | Oxford United Stars (4) |
| Hanover (5) | 4–4 (aet) (5–3 p) | Magherafelt Sky Blues (4) |
| Killyleagh Youth (4) | 0–3 | Drumaness Mills (4) |
| Malachians (4) | 1–4 (aet) | Crumlin Star (4) |
| Markethill Swifts (5) | 1–5 | East Belfast (6) |
| Newry City (4) | 1–0 | Donard Hospital (7) |
| Rathfern Rangers (6) | 2–5 | Albert Foundry (4) |
| Rathfriland Rangers (5) | 3–0 | Dunloy (4) |
| Sirocco Works (6) | 1–1 (aet) (1–3 p) | Lisburn Rangers (5) |
| Tandragee Rovers (4) | 5–1 | Ballymacash Rangers (4) |
| UUJ (5) | 2–0 | Wellington Recreation (6) |

Source: irishfa.com

=== Third round ===
The draw for the third round took place on 6 October 2014, with the matches played on 8, 15 and 29 November 2014. The 22 winners from the second round entered this round.

Note: All entrants at this stage were at regional level (tiers 4–7).

| Team 1 | Score | Team 2 |
|---|---|---|
8 November 2014
| Albert Foundry (4) | 6–1 | St Mary's (4) |
| Banbridge Rangers (4) | 0–2 | Tandragee Rovers (4) |
| Crumlin United (5) | 3–0 | UUJ (5) |
| Derriaghy Cricket Club (4) | 2–2 (aet) (2–0 p) | Oxford United Stars (4) |
| Drumaness Mills (4) | 1–2 | Brantwood (4) |
| East Belfast (6) | 3–5 | Newtowne (4) |
| Immaculata (4) | 0–2 | Crumlin Star (4) |
| Lisburn Rangers (5) | 2–7 (aet) | Ards Rangers (4) |
| Newry City (4) | 4–0 | Hanover (5) |
15 November 2014
| Abbey Villa (4) | 1–2 | Shankill United (4) |
29 November 2014
| 1st Bangor Old Boys (6) | 1–1 (aet) (6–5 p) | Rathfriland Rangers (5) |

Source: irishfa.com

=== Fourth round ===
The fourth round draw was made on 10 November 2014, with the matches played on 6 December 2014. The 11 winners from the third round matches entered this round, along with the 29 NIFL Championship clubs. 1st Bangor Old Boys were the lowest ranked team to reach this round – the only representatives as low as the sixth tier of the Northern Ireland football league system that still remained in the competition. However, the run came to an end after a 3–0 defeat to Annagh United.

Note: Intermediate clubs from tiers 2 and 3 entered the competition at this stage.

| Team 1 | Score | Team 2 |
|---|---|---|
| Annagh United (3) | 3–0 | 1st Bangor Old Boys (6) |
| Armagh City (2) | 2–0 | Shankill United (4) |
| Banbridge Town (3) | 1–4 | Ards (2) |
| Bangor (2) | 2–1 | Lurgan Celtic (3) |
| Carrick Rangers (2) | 4–1 | Albert Foundry (4) |
| Coagh United (3) | 0–2 | Brantwood (4) |
| Dergview (2) | 0–1 | Larne (2) |
| Derriaghy Cricket Club (4) | 3–2 | Wakehurst (3) |
| Donegal Celtic (2) | 2–3 (aet) | Ballyclare Comrades (2) |
| Dundela (2) | 4–1 | Ballymoney United (3) |
| Harland & Wolff Welders (2) | 2–0 | Dollingstown (3) |
| Limavady United (3) | 1–3 (aet) | Tobermore United (3) |
| Lisburn Distillery (2) | 0–1 | Crumlin Star (4) |
| Loughgall (2) | 6–2 | Tandragee Rovers (4) |
| Moyola Park (3) | 3–2 | Glebe Rangers (3) |
| Newtowne (4) | 4–1 | Crumlin United (5) |
| Portstewart (3) | 2–1 | Newry City (4) |
| PSNI (2) | 2–1 | Knockbreda (2) |
| Queen's University (3) | 2–3 | Newington YC (3) |
| Sport & Leisure Swifts (3) | 2–6 | Ards Rangers (4) |

Source: irishfa.com

=== Fifth round ===
The draw for the fifth round took place on 17 December 2014, with the games played on 10 and 20 January 2015. The 20 winners from the fourth round matches entered this round, along with the 12 NIFL Premiership clubs. The 5 clubs from the fourth tier that made it through to this round were the lowest ranked clubs remaining in the competition.

Note: Senior clubs from tier 1 entered the competition at this stage.

| 10 January 2015 | Harland & Wolff Welders (2) | 2 – 0 | Derriaghy Cricket Club (4) | Tillysburn Park, Belfast |
| 13:30 GMT | Deans 30'; Armstrong 80' | Report |

| 10 January 2015 | Portstewart (3) | 3 – 2 | Dundela (2) | Seahaven, Portstewart |
| 13:30 GMT | Stewart 8', 16'; Peden 59' | Report | Keenan 7'; Jackson 42' |

| 10 January 2015 | PSNI (2) | 1 – 2 (a.e.t.) | Portadown (1) | Newforge Lane, Belfast |
| 13:30 GMT | Agnew 24' | Report | Twigg 7'; Casement 110' |

| 10 January 2015 | Tobermore United (3) | 0 – 2 | Linfield (1) | Fortwilliam Park, Tobermore |
| 13:30 GMT | | Report | Waterworth 25', 81' |

| 10 January 2015 | Annagh United (3) | 1 – 3 | Ballyclare Comrades (2) | Tandragee Road, Portadown |
| 15:00 GMT | Campbell 53' | Report | Reid 9'; Brown 10', 87' |

| 10 January 2015 | Armagh City (2) | 3 – 0 | Newtowne (4) | Holm Park, Armagh |
| 15:00 GMT | Hoey 28'; Boyle 40'; Haveron 80' | Report |

| 10 January 2015 | Ballymena United (1) | 4 – 0 | Crumlin Star (4) | Ballymena Showgrounds, Ballymena |
| 15:00 GMT | Tipton 4' (pen.); McCutcheon 27'; Boyce 70', 83' | Report |

| 10 January 2015 | Bangor (2) | 4 – 0 | Brantwood (4) | Clandeboye Park, Bangor |
| 15:00 GMT | McDowell 12'; Youle 16'; Forsythe 25'; Nixon 79' | Report |

| 10 January 2015 | Cliftonville (1) | 6 – 0 | Ards Rangers (4) | Solitude, Belfast |
| 15:00 GMT | Gormley 12', 52'; J. Donnelly 42', 90'; McDaid 47'; Murray 75' | Report |

| 10 January 2015 | Coleraine (1) | 1 – 3 | Warrenpoint Town (1) | Coleraine Showgrounds, Coleraine |
| 15:00 GMT | Miskimmin 82' | Report | D. Hughes 65'; S. Hughes 79', 88' |

| 10 January 2015 | Crusaders (1) | 6 – 0 | Newington YC (3) | Seaview, Belfast |
| 15:00 GMT | Clarke 16'; Adamson 31'; Molloy 37'; O'Carroll 57', 84'; O'Flynn 81' | Report |

| 10 January 2015 | Dungannon Swifts (1) | 4 – 2 (a.e.t.) | Ballinamallard United (1) | Stangmore Park, Dungannon |
| 15:00 GMT | Hazley 2'; Glackin 18'; Liggett 98', 106' | Report | Courtney 37'; Kee 75' |

| 10 January 2015 | Glentoran (1) | 2 – 0 | Ards (2) | The Oval, Belfast |
| 15:00 GMT | McKee 60'; McCaffrey 90' | Report |

| 10 January 2015 | Institute (1) | 5 – 1 | Loughgall (2) | Riverside Stadium, Drumahoe |
| 15:00 GMT | McFadden 24'; Curry 51'; McManus 54', 59' (pen.); Walsh 73' | Report | Ferguson 12' |

| 10 January 2015 | Larne (2) | A – A | Carrick Rangers (2) | Inver Park, Larne |
| 15:00 GMT | | Match abandoned with the score at 0–0 after 28 minutes due to a serious player injury. Report |

| 10 January 2015 | Moyola Park (3) | 2 – 3 | Glenavon (1) | Mill Meadow, Castledawson |
| 15:00 GMT | Walls 13'; Dowie 30' | Report | Braniff 48', 62'; Bradley 89' |

| 20 January 2015 | Larne (2) | 1 – 2 | Carrick Rangers (2) | Inver Park, Larne |
| 19:45 GMT | McCabe 65' | Report | Chines 38' (pen.); McCloskey 75' |

=== Sixth round ===
The sixth round draw took place after the fifth round matches had been played, with the fixtures played on 7 February 2015. The 16 winners from the fifth-round matches entered this round. Third-tier club Portstewart were the lowest-ranked side to reach this stage of the competition.

Linfield's home tie against Warrenpoint Town was initially delayed until 16 February 2015 to allow time for an IFA investigation into allegations that a Warrenpoint Town player, Darren Forsyth, who had played in the 3–1 win over Coleraine in the previous round may have been ineligible. In the event of Forsyth being deemed as ineligible, Warrenpoint Town would have faced expulsion from the competition, with Coleraine reinstated as Linfield's sixth round opponents. However, the IFA later cleared Forsyth to play. At the request of both clubs, the match was rescheduled back to its original date of 7 February 2015.

| 7 February 2015 | Harland & Wolff Welders (2) | 2 – 0 | Glenavon (1) | Tillysburn Park, Belfast |
| 13:30 GMT | Rainey 11'; Davidson 74' | Report |

| 7 February 2015 | Portstewart (3) | 0 – 2 | Portadown (1) | Seahaven, Portstewart |
| 13:30 GMT | | Report | Twigg 77'; Murray 90' |

| 7 February 2015 | Ballyclare Comrades (2) | 0 – 0 (a.e.t.) (4 – 5 p) | Dungannon Swifts (1) | Dixon Park, Ballyclare |
| 15:00 GMT | | Report |

| 7 February 2015 | Bangor (2) | 0 – 2 | Crusaders (1) | Clandeboye Park, Bangor |
| 15:00 GMT | | Report | O'Carroll 17' (pen.); O'Flynn 63' |

| 7 February 2015 | Carrick Rangers (2) | 3 – 1 (a.e.t.) | Institute (1) | Taylors Avenue, Carrickfergus |
| 15:00 GMT | Lagan 88'; Chines 95'; Dick 110' | Report | McFadden 75' |

| 7 February 2015 | Cliftonville (1) | 1 – 2 | Ballymena United (1) | Solitude, Belfast |
| 15:00 GMT | McMullan 47' (pen.) | Report | Cushley 90', 90+3' |

| 7 February 2015 | Glentoran (1) | 4 – 1 | Armagh City (2) | The Oval, Belfast |
| 15:00 GMT | Gordon 50'; McAlorum 58'; Allen 69'; McCaffrey 81' | Report | Murray 79' |

| 7 February 2015 | Linfield (1) | 5 – 0 | Warrenpoint Town (1) | Windsor Park, Belfast |
| 15:00 GMT | Burns 10'; Waterworth 45', 83', 87'; Lowry 90+1' | Report |

=== Quarter-finals ===
The quarter-final draw took place on 7 February 2015 after the sixth round matches had been played, with the matches played on 28 February 2015. The 8 winners of the sixth round matches entered the quarter-finals. Carrick Rangers and Harland & Wolff Welders were the lowest ranked sides to reach the quarter-finals, as the only two clubs from outside the top-flight remaining in the competition.

| 28 February 2015 | Harland & Wolff Welders (2) | 2 – 3 | Ballymena United (1) | Tillysburn Park, Belfast |
| 13:30 GMT | McLellan 34' (pen.), 51' | Report | Boyce 78'; Tipton 85'; Thompson 90+5' |

| 28 February 2015 | Crusaders (1) | 4 – 1 | Carrick Rangers (2) | Seaview, Belfast |
| 15:00 GMT | Clarke 55', 85'; O'Carroll 64'; Whyte 86' | Report | McClean 41' (o.g.) |

| 28 February 2015 | Glentoran (1) | 3 – 0 | Dungannon Swifts (1) | The Oval, Belfast |
| 15:00 GMT | Allen 14'; Kane 67'; Henderson 85' | Report |

| 28 February 2015 | Portadown (1) | 3 – 2 | Linfield (1) | Shamrock Park, Portadown |
| 15:00 GMT | Casement 8' (pen.); Twigg 23', 43' | Report | Lowry 72', 85' |

=== Semi-finals ===
The 4 quarter-final winners entered the semi-finals, with the matches played on 21 March 2015 at neutral venues.

| 21 March 2015 | Crusaders (1) | 0 – 1 | Glentoran (1) | Mourneview Park, Lurgan |
| 15:00 GMT | | Report | Allen 39' |

| 21 March 2015 | Ballymena United (1) | 1 – 3 | Portadown (1) | The Oval, Belfast |
| 17:30 GMT | Boyce 70' | Report | McAllister 4'; Gault 16'; McMahon 27' |

=== Final ===
On 2 May 2015, the final was played at the Oval, Belfast for the first time since 1995. It was switched from the usual venue following the discovery of damage to a stand at Windsor Park. Glentoran had reached the final for the second time in three seasons, after winning the cup in 2013. Portadown had last reached the final in 2010, when they lost 2–1 against Linfield. It was only the third ever meeting between the two sides in the final, with Glentoran being the victors on both previous occasions. In fact, Portadown had never scored a goal against the Glens in a final, losing 3–0 in 1990 and 1–0 in the last meeting in 2000. The trend continued, with Glentoran winning once again without conceding a goal, to lift the cup for the 22nd time overall.

2 May 2015
14:30 BST

| Glentoran (1) | 1 – 0 | Portadown (1) |
|---|---|---|
| Scullion 54' | BBC Sport; IFA |

The Oval, Belfast
Attendance: 8,072
Referee: Ross Dunlop
