= 2009–10 Irish Cup =

Tournament details
- Country: Northern Ireland
- Teams: 105

Final positions
- Champions: Linfield (40th win)
- Runners-up: Portadown

Tournament statistics
- Matches played: 110
- Goals scored: 435 (3.95 per match)

The 2009–10 Irish Cup was the 130th edition of the Irish Cup, Northern Ireland's premier football knock-out cup competition. The competition began on 19 September 2009 with the first Round and ended on 8 May 2010 with the final.

Crusaders were the defending champions, winning their third Irish Cup the previous season after a 1–0 win over Cliftonville in the 2009 final. This season they reached the quarter-finals, but were defeated by Portadown. Linfield went on to lift their 40th Irish Cup, and fourth in five years, beating Portadown 2–1 in the final. Portadown earned a place in the first qualifying round of the 2010–11 UEFA Europa League because Linfield had already qualified for the UEFA Champions League via the 2009–10 IFA Premiership.

== Results ==
=== First round ===
The matches were played on 19 September 2009.

Team 1	Score	Team 2
Barn United	4–2	Oxford United
Bryansburn Rangers	3–2	NFC Kesh
Comber Recreation	2–1	Drumaness Mills
Desertmartin	0–1	Hanover
Islandmagee	2–0	Abbey Villa
Kilbride Swifts	1–3	Downpatrick
Kilmore Recreation	2–1	Ballynahinch United
Lisburn Rangers	3–2	East Belfast
Lower Maze	2–3	Oxford United Stars
Malachians	3–1	Ballynure Old Boys
Mountjoy United	1–2	Crewe United
Newcastle	4–0	Ardstraw
Newington Youth Club	2–0	Laurelvale
Nortel	6–1	Bloomfield
Rosario Youth Club	5–0	Roe Valley
Strabane	5–5 (1–3p)	Lurgan Town Boys
Wellington Recreation	8–0	Downshire Young Men

Bye: 1st Bangor Old Boys, Albert Foundry, Ards Rangers, Ballymacash Rangers, Banbridge Rangers, Brantwood, Broomhedge, Crumlin United, Dollingstown, Draperstown Celtic, Dromara Village, Dungiven Celtic, Dunmurry Rec., Fivemiletown United, Grove United, Holywood, Killyleagh Youth, Magherafelt Sky Blues, Mosside, Newbuildings United, Omagh United, Raceview, Rathfriland Rangers, Richhill, Saintfield United, Seagoe, Shorts, Sirocco Works, Tandragee Rovers, U.U.J, Warrenpoint Town

=== Second round ===
The matches were played on 24 and 31 October 2009.

Team 1	Score	Team 2
24 October 2009
Ards Rangers	5–1	Crumlin United
Ballymacash Rangers	1–0	Downpatrick
Banbridge Rangers	0–4	Albert Foundry
Brantwood	4–1	Tandragee Rovers
Comber Recreation	7–1	Broomhedge
Dromara Village	1–2	Dollingstown
Dungiven Celtic	2–2 (4–2p)	Rathfriland Rangers
Dunmurry Rec.	4–2	Barn United
Holywood	4–1	Shorts
Islandmagee	6–4	Crewe United
Killyleagh Youth	5–0	Saintfield United
Lurgan Town Boys	1–5	Newcastle
Magherafelt Sky Blues	3–2	Newington Youth Club
Malachians	3–2	1st Bangor Old Boys
Mosside	5–1	Richhill
Nortel	4–0	Newbuildings United
Omagh United	3–2	Kilmore Recreation
Oxford United Stars	2–0	Grove United
Rosario Youth Club	3–4	Bryansburn Rangers
Seagoe	1–5	Lisburn Rangers
Warrenpoint Town	4–1	Hanover
Wellington Recreation	5–0	Sirocco Works
31 October 2009
Draperstown Celtic	2–1	Raceview
Fivemiletown United	3–2	U.U.J

=== Third round ===
Team 1	Score	Team 2
21 November 2009
Comber Recreation	2–1	Ballymacash Rangers
Magherafelt Sky Blues	1–2	Holywood
Malachians	4–1	Newcastle
Omagh United	w/o	Mosside (withdrew)
Oxford United Stars	2–2 (5–3p)	Albert Foundry
Warrenpoint Town	0–1	Dollingstown
28 November 2009
Bryansburn Rangers	3–1	Dungiven Celtic
Draperstown Celtic	1–4	Ards Rangers
Islandmagee	6–2	Dunmurry Rec.
Killyleagh Youth	2–3	Brantwood
Lisburn Rangers	1–2	Nortel
Wellington Recreation	4–2	Fivemiletown United

=== Fourth round ===
Team 1	Score	Team 2
12 December 2009
Armagh City	1–1 (1–3p)	Loughgall
Ballinamallard United	9–0	Chimney Corner
Ballyclare Comrades	2–0	PSNI
Ballymoney United	4–0	Brantwood
Banbridge Town	2–3	Bangor
Bryansburn Rangers	2–2 (5–4p)	Oxford United Stars
Carrick Rangers	3–1	Annagh United
Coagh United	2–0	Holywood
Dergview	2–3	Dundela
Dollingstown	2–3	Ards Rangers
Donegal Celtic	1–0	Queen's University
Harland & Wolff Welders	2–1	Wellington Recreation
Killymoon Rangers	0–0 (2–4p)	Nortel
Knockbreda	1–2	Ards
Larne	2–0	Moyola Park
Limavady United	1–3	Malachians
Lurgan Celtic	1–2	Islandmagee
Tobermore United	2–1	Comber Recreation
15 December 2009
Glebe Rangers	1–0	Wakehurst
19 December 2009
Sport & Leisure Swifts	0–2	Omagh United

=== Fifth round ===
Team 1	Score	Team 2
16 January 2010
Ballyclare Comrades	5–1	Islandmagee
Ballymena United	0–0	Ards
Carrick Rangers	1–1	Portadown
Coagh United	1–0	Tobermore United
Crusaders	5–1	Bangor
Donegal Celtic	0–4	Linfield
Dundela	0–2	Coleraine
Dungannon Swifts	6–0	Malachians
Glenavon	5–1	Harland & Wolff Welders
Glentoran	5–0	Omagh United
Institute	1–1	Ballymoney United
Lisburn Distillery	0–2	Cliftonville
Loughgall	3–1	Ards Rangers
Newry City	2–1	Larne
Nortel	2–2	Bryansburn Rangers
19 January 2010
Glebe Rangers	0–3	Ballinamallard United

==== Replays ====
Team 1	Score	Team 2
19 January 2010
Ballymena United	1–0	Ards
Portadown	1–0	Carrick Rangers
20 January 2010
Ballymoney United	0–1	Institute
27 January 2010
Bryansburn Rangers	2–2 (3–5p)	Nortel

=== Sixth round ===
Team 1	Score	Team 2
13 February 2010
Ballyclare Comrades	1–2	Glentoran
Ballymena United	5–2	Ballinamallard United
Coleraine	6–0	Nortel
Crusaders	4–0	Coagh United
Glenavon	2–1	Institute
Linfield	4–0	Dungannon Swifts
Portadown	2–1	Cliftonville
27 March 2010
Loughgall	1–1	Newry City

==== Replays ====
Team 1	Score	Team 2
7 April 2010
Newry City	1–0	Loughgall

=== Quarter-finals ===
Team 1	Score	Team 2
6 March 2010
Glenavon	3–3	Ballymena United
Crusaders	1–1	Portadown
Glentoran	1–3	Linfield
10 April 2010
Coleraine	3–2	Newry City

==== Replays ====
Team 1	Score	Team 2
9 March 2010
Ballymena United	2–0	Glenavon
Portadown	1–0	Crusaders

=== Semi-finals ===
Team 1	Score	Team 2
10 April 2010
Ballymena United	1–1 (3–4p)	Portadown
17 April 2010
Linfield	4–2	Coleraine

=== Final ===
8 May 2010
14:30 BST

Linfield	2–1	Portadown
Thompson 2'; Lowry 10'	Report	Braniff 13'

Windsor Park, Belfast
Attendance: 7,940
Referee: Mark Courtney
