= 2003–04 Irish Cup =

Tournament details
- Country: Northern Ireland
- Teams: 91

Final positions
- Champions: Glentoran (20th win)
- Runners-up: Coleraine

Tournament statistics
- Matches played: 102
- Goals scored: 394 (3.86 per match)

The 2003–04 Irish Cup was the 124th edition of the Irish Cup, Northern Ireland's premier football knock-out cup competition. It concluded on 1 May 2004 with the final.

Coleraine were the defending champions, winning their 5th Irish Cup last season after a 1–0 win over Glentoran in the 2003 final. This season the same two clubs reached the final again. A 1–0 victory for Glentoran, who were appearing in the final for the sixth time in nine years was enough to seal their 20th Irish Cup win.

== Results ==
The following teams were given byes into the second round: Strabane, Kilbride Swifts, Newington, Ballymacash Rangers, Richhill, Queen's University, and Killymoon Rangers.

=== First round ===
| Team 1 | Score | Team 2 |
|---|---|---|
| 1st Bangor Old Boys | 2–3 | Donard Hospital |
| Abbey Villa | 2–0 | Bangor Amateurs |
| Albert Foundry | 3–2 | Warrenpoint Town |
| Ballynahinch United | 0–2 | Dunmurry Young Men |
| Blackers Mill | 2–4 | Larne Tech Old Boys |
| Broomhedge | 0–0 (a.e.t.) (8–9 p) | Markethill Swifts |
| Civil Service | 4–3 | Malachians |
| Desertmartin | 2–1 | Hanover |
| Dromore Amateurs | 3–1 | Roe Valley |
| Glebe Rangers | 5–0 | Tandragee Rovers |
| Holywood | 0–2 | Wakehurst |
| Islandmagee | 5–2 | Dungiven Celtic |
| Laurelvale | 3–1 | Annagh United |
| Lisburn Rangers | 1–0 | Shorts |
| Lower Maze | 1–2 | Sperrin Olympic |
| Magherafelt Sky Blues | 0–6 | Wellington Recreation |
| Nortel | 3–2 | Dundonald |
| Oxford United Stars | 3–2 | Grove United |
| Seagoe | 2–5 | Rasharkin United |
| Sirocco Works | 1–3 | Barn United |
| UUC | 2–1 | Downshire Young Men |

=== Second round ===
| Team 1 | Score | Team 2 |
|---|---|---|
| Albert Foundry | 3–0 | Dromore Amateurs |
| Ballymacash Rangers | 2–1 | UUC |
| Barn United | 3–2 | Desertmartin |
| Civil Service | 2–6 | Wakehurst |
| Dunmurry Young Men | 0–1 | Rasharkin United |
| Killymoon Rangers | 1–2 | Larne Tech Old Boys |
| Lisburn Rangers | 0–2 | Abbey Villa |
| Newington | 2–1 | Laurelvale |
| Nortel | 5–3 | Richhill |
| Orangefield Old Boys | 3–0 | Sperrin Olympic |
| Oxford United Stars | 1–2 | Islandmagee |
| Strabane | 1–0 | Markethill Swifts |
| Wellington Recreation | 2–0 | Glebe Rangers |

=== Third round ===
| Team 1 | Score | Team 2 |
|---|---|---|
| Barn United | w/o | Crewe United |
| Coagh United | 2–3 | Portstewart |
| Killyleagh Youth | 3–2 | East Belfast |
| PSNI | 6–4 | Rasharkin United |
| Queen's University | w/o | Donard Hospital |
| Wellington Recreation | 1–3 | Abbey Villa |

=== Third round (A) ===
| Team 1 | Score | Team 2 |
|---|---|---|
| Ards Rangers | 5–1 | Moyola Park |
| Ballymacash Rangers | 0–3 | PSNI |
| Ballymoney United | 4–3 | Wakehurst |
| Barn United | 0–3 | Comber Recreation |
| Brantwood | 3–1 | Abbey Villa |
| Crumlin United | 1–3 | Portstewart |
| Donegal Celtic | 1–0 | Ballinamallard United |
| Dromara Village | 2–3 | Lurgan Celtic |
| Dunmurry Recreation | 1–5 | Drumaness Mills |
| Harland & Wolff Welders | 4–0 | Knockbreda Parish |
| Islandmagee | 5–4 | Newington |
| Kilbride Swifts | 0–5 | Albert Foundry |
| Kilmore Recreation | 4–4 (a.e.t.) (4–5 p) | Nortel |
| Larne Tech Old Boys | 1–3 | Killyleagh Youth |
| Orangefield Old Boys | 5–2 | Enkalon |
| Rathfriland Rangers | 0–2 | Donard Hospital |
| Strabane | 2–2 (a.e.t.) (2–4 p) | Chimney Corner |

=== Fourth round ===
| Team 1 | Score | Team 2 |
|---|---|---|
| Ballymoney United | 2–1 | Ards Rangers |
| Brantwood | 0–0 (a.e.t.) (6–5 p) | Orangefield Old Boys |
| Chimney Corner | 1–1 (a.e.t.) (7–8 p) | Albert Foundry |
| Donegal Celtic | 3–1 | PSNI |
| Drumaness Mills | 1–3 | Donard Hospital |
| Harland & Wolff Welders | 1–1 (a.e.t.) (5–4 p) | Dundela |
| Killyleagh Youth | 3–2 | Islandmagee |
| Lurgan Celtic | 2–1 | Comber Recreation |
| Portstewart | 4–5 | Nortel |

=== Fifth round ===
| Team 1 | Score | Team 2 |
|---|---|---|
| Ards | 10–0 | Donard Hospital |
| Ballyclare Comrades | 3–0 | Donegal Celtic |
| Cliftonville | 5–1 | Lisburn Distillery |
| Coleraine | 1–1 | Harland & Wolff Welders |
| Crusaders | 0–1 | Brantwood |
| Dungannon Swifts | 3–1 | Ballynure Old Boys |
| Glentoran | 4–2 | Ballymena United |
| Larne | 2–0 | Institute |
| Limavady United | 4–0 | Armagh City |
| Linfield | 0–0 | Carrick Rangers |
| Loughgall | 3–1 | Killyleagh Youth |
| Lurgan Celtic | 1–3 | Bangor |
| Newry Town | 2–2 | Ballymoney United |
| Omagh Town | 5–3 | Albert Foundry |
| Portadown | 0–1 | Glenavon |
| Tobermore United | 3–1 | Nortel |

==== Replays ====
| Team 1 | Score | Team 2 |
|---|---|---|
| Ballymoney United | 1–3 | Newry Town |
| Carrick Rangers | 1–4 | Linfield |
| Coleraine | 4–1 | Harland & Wolff Welders |

=== Sixth round ===
| Team 1 | Score | Team 2 |
|---|---|---|
| Ballyclare Comrades | 0–2 | Ards |
| Bangor | 0–0 | Linfield |
| Cliftonville | 0–1 | Coleraine |
| Dungannon Swifts | 1–1 | Glenavon |
| Loughgall | 0–0 | Glentoran |
| Newry Town | 2–1 | Larne |
| Omagh Town | 2–1 | Brantwood |
| Tobermore United | 0–4 | Limavady United |

==== Replays ====
| Team 1 | Score | Team 2 |
|---|---|---|
| Glenavon | 1–0 | Dungannon Swifts |
| Glentoran | 2–0 | Loughgall |
| Linfield | 7–0 | Bangor |

=== Quarter-finals ===
| Team 1 | Score | Team 2 |
|---|---|---|
| Ards | 1–2 | Omagh Town |
| Limavady United | 2–0 | Glenavon |
| Linfield | 0–1 | Glentoran |
| Newry Town | 1–1 | Coleraine |

==== Replay ====
| Team 1 | Score | Team 2 |
|---|---|---|
| Coleraine | 3–1 | Newry Town |

=== Semi-finals ===
| Team 1 | Score | Team 2 |
|---|---|---|
| Coleraine | 3–1 | Limavady United |
| Glentoran | 4–1 | Omagh Town |

=== Final ===
1 May 2004

| Coleraine | 0 – 1 | Glentoran |
|---|---|---|
| | Report | Halliday 21' |

Windsor Park, Belfast
Attendance: 8,300
