= CofC =

CofC may refer to:

- Children of the Confederacy, American lineage society
- Church of Christ, non-denominational Christian church influenced by the Restoration Movement
- Community of Christ, American-based international church, focused on peace and justice
- College of Charleston, public university located in Charleston, South Carolina
- Certificate of Conformity, Conformance or Compliance Certificate of Conformity
- 2-phospho-L-lactate guanylyltransferase, an enzyme

CoFC may refer to:

- United States Court of Federal Claims

COFC may refer to:

- "Container on Flatcar", a form of intermodal freight transport with intermodal containers
- Certificate of Formula Compliance Certificate of Formula Compliance
- Cherry Orchard F.C., an Irish football club
- Cookstown Olympic F.C., a Northern Irish football club
