= Dungannon Tigers F.C. =

Dungannon Tigers
- Full name: Dungannon Tigers Football Club
- Founded: 2004
- Ground: Joe McAree Stadium
- Chairman: Neil Phillips
- Manager: Jason Toner
- League: Mid-Ulster Football League Intermediate B

Dungannon Tigers Football Club is an intermediate-level football club playing in the Intermediate B division of the Mid-Ulster Football League in Northern Ireland. The club, which forms part of the Mid-Ulster Football Association, plays all home games at the Joe McAree Stadium, Dungannon.

== Honours ==
- 2004 - Cookstown Street League winners
- 2006 - Lonsdale League champions
- 2008 - Beckett Cup winners
- 2009 - Mufl Div 3 dhampions
- 2010 - Mulf Div 2 champions
- 2010 - Foster Cup winners
- 2014 - Intermediate B Cup winners
