= Caledon Rovers F.C. =

Caledon Rovers
- Full name: Caledon Rovers Football Club
- Founded: 1998
- Ground: Tanyard Park
- Chairman: Kevin O'Connor
- League: Mid-Ulster Football Association

Caledon Rovers Football Club, referred to as Caledon Rovers, or simply Rovers, is an intermediate-level football club competing in the club competing in the Division 1 of the Mid-Ulster Football League in Northern Ireland. The club is based in Caledon, County Tyrone.

Caledon Rovers are a member of the Mid-Ulster Football Association and participate in the Irish Cup. Rovers also participate in regional cup competitions, including the Armstrong Cup and the Alexandra Cup.

In May 2021, Caledon Rovers hosted a royal visit from King Charles III (then Prince of Wales) and Camilla. During the visit, he met with club officials, including Chairman of Youth Soccer Stephen Gillis and Club Chairman Kevin O'Connor, as well as local coaches and community members. The chairman jokes that he

Caledon Rovers were founded in 1998 in the village of Caledon, County Tyrone. They went on to join the Mid-Ulster Football League.

In 2016, Caledon Rovers won Division 3 of the Mid-Ulster Football League, having won 16 of their first 16 games. They sealed it when they beat Donacloney away. The following month, Caledon Rovers completed a double, when they reached the Beckett Cup final and thrashed Moira Albion 7–0.

In 2017, Caledon Rovers reached the Armstrong Cup final for the first time. They met the previous year's winners Tandragee Rovers and narrowly beat them 2–1 at Mill Field.

== Club identity and crest ==
The Caledon Rovers crest depicts a heraldic shield and two stags, which is the Caledon family coat of arms known as the Earls of Caledon. Red Deer are a common sight on the Caledon Estate and are associated with the Alexander family, the earls. The Caledon Castle is also represented on the badge. The tree's represent Caledon Estates ancient woodland.

The club play in black and yellow. Rovers play their home games at Tanyard Park in Woodview Terrace.

== Academy ==
The club have a youth academy with multiple age divisions for boys and girls. They train at the Mini Soccer Development Centre. They are known as Caledon Rovers Youth, and compete in the Mid-Ulster Youth League.

== Honours ==
Mid-Ulster Football League

- Division 3
  - 2015/16
- Armstrong Cup
  - 2017
- Beckett Cup
  - 2015/16
- Reserve 4
  - 2017/18 - Won by reserves team
