= Glenavy =

Village in County Antrim, Northern Ireland

Coordinates: 54.592°N 6.214°W

Glenavy: Irish: Lann Abhaigh
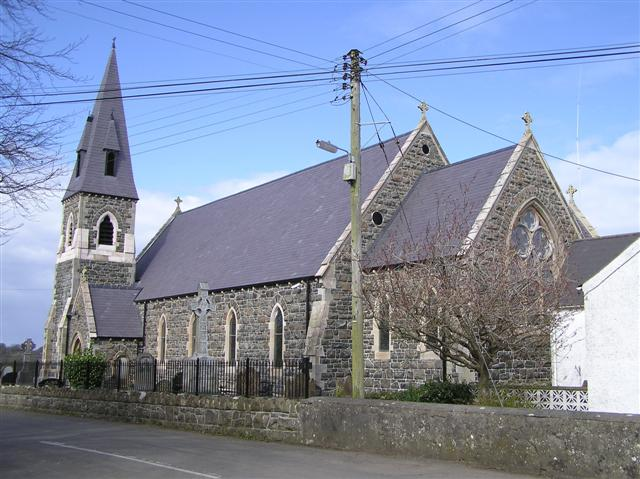
- Glenavy Catholic church

- Location within Northern Ireland
- Population: 2,384 (2021 census)
- Irish grid reference: J154729
  - Belfast: 13 mi (21 km)
- District: Lisburn
- County: County Antrim
- Country: Northern Ireland
- Sovereign state: United Kingdom
- Post town: CRUMLIN
- Postcode district: BT29
- Dialling code: 028, +44 28
- UK Parliament: South Antrim
- NI Assembly: South Antrim

Glenavy (from Irish Lann Abhaigh, meaning 'church of the dwarf') is a village and civil parish in County Antrim, Northern Ireland. It is approximately 11 miles west of Belfast and eight miles north-west of Lisburn, and sits on the banks of the Glenavy river. In the 2021 census the village had a population of 2,384 people. In early documents it was written as "Lenavy".

== Transport ==
Glenavy railway station was opened on 13 November 1871, and was part of the now closed Knockmore line. The station was closed in 2003

== Sport ==
Glenavy is home to an intermediate-standard football team. Crewe United and Glenavy F.C. are members of the Mid-Ulster Football League. They play in Intermediate A and Division 2 respectively.

The area is also home to St. Joseph's Gaelic Athletic Association (GAA) club.

== Fraternities ==
In the Orange Order, the Glenavy District have nine private lodges and seven Orange Halls. They are associated with the South Antrim Combine. The Glenavy Protestant Hall was built in 1870.

== Notable residents ==
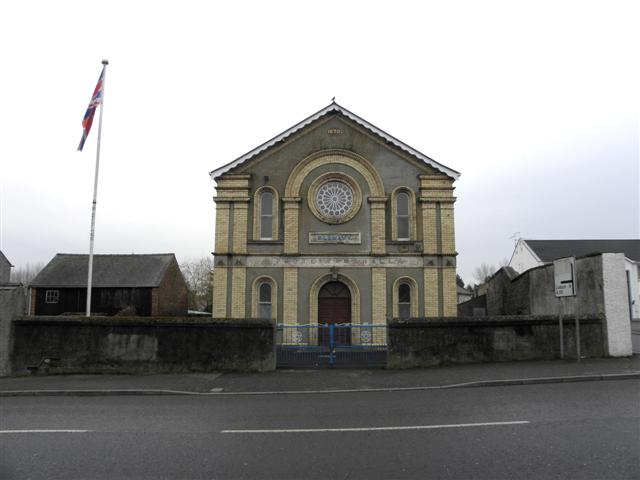
Glenavy Protestant Hall

- John Ballance, Premier of New Zealand in the late nineteenth century
- Samuel Hill, recipient of the Victoria Cross
- Ivor Jess, disability sports campaigner
- Anne Acheson, sculptor and co-inventor of paper-mache casts for broken limbs

== See also ==
- List of civil parishes of County Antrim
