= RAFC =

RAFC can stand for:

- Rabat Ajax F.C., a Maltese association football club
- RAF College Cranwell
- Rákosszentmihályi AFC, a Hungarian association football club
- Rangiora A.F.C., a New Zealand association football club
- Richhill A.F.C., a Northern Irish association football club
- Richmond Athletic F.C., a New Zealand association football club
- Rochdale Association Football Club, an English association football club
- Royal Antwerp FC, a Belgian association football club
- Royal Albert F.C., a Scottish association football club

== See also ==
- RFC (disambiguation)
