= Camlough Rovers F.C. =

Association football club in Northern Ireland

- Full name: Camlough Rovers Football Club
- Founded: 1980
- Ground: Newry Road; Camlough, County Armagh
- Chairman: Jackie Mooney
Home colours

Camlough Rovers Football Club is a junior-level football club situated in Camlough, County Armagh and playing in the Carnbane League. The club was founded in 1980 and are known for wearing the traditional colours of Green and white. Camlough Rovers secured the Intermediate B title and promotion to Intermediate A in 2010-11 winning the league by a narrow margin of one single point, this was achieved in Gary Quinn's first season as first team manager. In the following season Camlough's first year in Intermediate A, was definitely one to remember, winning it in their first season after being promoted from Intermediate B. Camlough Rovers first played in Northern Ireland's biggest cup competition the JJB Irish Cup (now known as the Tennent's Irish Cup) on Saturday 18 September 2010 against Lurgan Town Boys (now known as Lurgan Town FC) Camlough Rovers won the game 5–2 with goals from S. Hughes x3, D. Monaghan and M. McCormack making it a debut win to the competition, and followed this win with a brilliant performance in the second round, overcoming Barn United FC beating them 2–0, with goals from S. Kane and D. Monaghan. In 2019 the club dropped from intermediate into junior football. During its time as an intermediate club, it played in the Irish Cup.

As well as the first team, the club also field numerous youth teams from ages of 6–17, and also a senior reserve team who compete in the Lonsdale League.

== 2011–12 ==
The season 2011-12 Gary Quinn managed his side to one of the club's most successful years winning the Mid-Ulster Football League Intermediate A in their debut season giving them back-to-back league titles after being promoted from Intermediate B by topping the table by one single point.

== Honours ==
- Mid-Ulster Football League titles: 2
- Intermediate A: 1
- Intermediate B: 1
