= HSFC =

HSFC may refer to:

In Space Program:

- Human Space Flight Centre, an Indian organisation.

In education:

- Hartlepool Sixth Form College
- Havering Sixth Form College
- Hereford Sixth Form College

In association football:

- Heybridge Swifts F.C.
- Hill Street F.C.
- Holwell Sports F.C.
- Hullbridge Sports F.C.
