= Damolly F.C. =

Damolly
- Full name: Damolly Football Club
- Founded: 1985
- Ground: Norman Brown Park
- Chairman: Kenny Cowan (Former)
- Manager: Gareth Young
- League: Mid-Ulster Football League

Damolly Football Club, commonly referred to as Damolly F.C. or simply Damolly, is an intermediate-level football club playing in Division 1 of the Mid-Ulster Football League in Northern Ireland.

The club was established in 1985 and is based in north of Newry, County Down. Damolly operates two senior men's teams, as Damolly reserves compete in the Mid-Ulster Reserves League. Damolly have a women's team, known as Damolly Women's Social Football Team.

Damolly F.C. is a member of the Mid-Ulster Football Association and its first team compete in the Irish Cup. They also compete in regional tournaments, including the Mid-Ulster League Cup, Marshall Cup and the John Magee Cup. The latter of which they won in 2024, beating Dunnaman 3-1.

== Club identity and ground ==
The club play their home games at Norman Brown Park in Shannon Park. Their home and away kits are orange and blues respectively.

The Damolly crest features a linen mill, water wheel and chimneys, which represents the Damolly Mill in the former hamlet. It was a key feature in Damolly, built in 1936, it was used for weaving linen, and would wake up the locals from their slumber.

The club have youth teams, training boys and girls under each age group. Teams are fielded in the Mid-Ulster Youth League.

In March 2024, Joanne Patterson was awarded with a special recognition award called the Inspirational Impact Award for outstanding leadership and dedication. It was awarded by the Irish Football Association.

In 2025, the club posted a statement as they expressed sadness for the passing of former chairman Kenny Cowan.

== Honours ==
Mid-Ulster Football League

- John Magee Memorial Cup
  - 2023/24
- Foster Cup
  - 2024/25
- Mid Ulster Division 3
  - promotion 2023/24 - promotion
- Mid Ulster Division 2
  - 2024/25 - promotion

Irish Football Association

- Inspirational Impact Award for outstanding leadership and dedication
  - 2024 - Joanne Patterson (Damolly Women)
