= CWFC (disambiguation) =

CWFC may refer to:

- Cage Warriors Fighting Championship
- Clipstone Welfare F.C.
- Cork Women's F.C.
- Cray Wanderers F.C.
- Cregagh Wanderers F.C.
