= Scarva Rangers F.C. =

Scarva Rangers
- Full name: Scarva Rangers Football Club
- Nickname: The Rangers
- Founded: 1972
- Ground: Scarva Park
- Chairman: Sam Grattan
- League: Mid-Ulster Football League

Scarva Rangers Football Club, referred to as Scarva Rangers, or simply Scarva, and also by their nickname "The Rangers", is an intermediate-level football club competing in the Mid-Ulster Football League in Northern Ireland. The club is based in the village of Scarva, County Down and was established in 1972. Scarva Rangers currently operates two senior men's teams. They also have a youth academy for boys and girls in multiple age divisions.

The club is a member of the Mid-Ulster Football Association and is eligible to compete in the IFA Junior Cup and the national cup competition, the Irish Cup. They also participate in regional cup competitions, including the Marshall Cup and the Alexandra Cup.

== Ground and identity ==
Scarva Rangers play their home games at Scarva Park. It is a Green Flag Award winning village park. The Rangers home kit colours are royal blue and maroon stripes. Their away kit is black.

Scarva Rangers chairman Sam Grattan thanked Banbridge District Council for the club's access to "Superb training facilities" and for providing "one of the very best grass pitches in Mid-Ulster".

Scarva Rangers hold an annual club awards night.

== Honours ==
Mid-Ulster Football League

- Intermediate B
  - 1994/95
- Division 2
  - 2012/13, 2021/22
- Ironside Cup
  - 2011
  - Runners-up: 2007, 2008, 2009
- Alexandra Cup
  - Runners-up: 2015
