= RRFC =

RRFC may refer to:

- Raith Rovers F.C., a professional football club based in Kirkcaldy who currently play in the Scottish Football League First Division
- Rathfern Rangers F.C., a Northern Irish football club
- Rathfriland Rangers F.C., a Northern Irish football club
- Rectory Rangers F.C., a Northern Irish football club
- Rosemount Rec F.C., a Northern Irish football club
- Reading R.F.C., an English rugby union club based in the village of Sonning, on the outskirts of Reading
- Risborough Rangers F.C., an English non-league football club
