= Dungannon Rovers F.C. =

Association football club in Northern Ireland

Dungannon Rovers
- Full name: Dungannon Rovers Football Club
- Founded: 2001
- Dissolved: 2017
- Ground: Drumcoo Playing Fields
- League: Mid-Ulster Football League

Dungannon Rovers Football Club was an intermediate-level football club that played in the Mid-Ulster Football League in Northern Ireland. They now play in the Daily Mirror Mid Ulster League Division 3. The club is based in Dungannon, County Tyrone. The club, which has played in the Irish Cup, forms part of the Mid-Ulster Football Association.
