= Lists of association football clubs =

List of lists of soccer clubs

This is a list of lists of association football clubs from all over the world. Each of the articles linked from here lists clubs playing at the highest level in each country; for clubs playing at lower divisions, see separate linked articles.

== Europe (UEFA) ==
- List of football clubs in England
- List of football clubs in Northern Ireland
- List of football clubs in Scotland
- List of football clubs in Wales

== See also ==
- List of football clubs by competitive honours won
- List of men's national association football teams
- List of association football competitions
- Association football club names
