= LRFC =

LRFC may refer to:

- Lancaster RFC
- Letterkenny Rovers F.C.
- Linlithgow Rose F.C.
- Lisburn Rangers F.C.
- Lisburn Rovers F.C.
- Liverpool Ramblers F.C.
- Lydney Rugby Football Club
