= BFC =

BFC or bfc may refer to:

== Arts and entertainment ==
- Bellator Fighting Championships, an American mixed martial arts promotion (2008–2025)
- Berliner Film Companie, a former German film and TV production company (2002–2009)
- Black Family Channel, an American television network (1999–2007)
- Brighton Festival Chorus, an English choir (formed 1968)

== Association football ==
- Ballyoran F.C., Northern Ireland
- Ballyvea F.C., Northern Ireland
- Bangor F.C., Northern Ireland
- Barnet F.C., North London, England
- Barnsley F.C., North East England
- Beachside FC, Tasmania, Australia
- Bearsted F.C., South East England
- Belgrave Football Club, Victoria, Australia
- Belvoir F.C., Northern Ireland
- Bengaluru FC, India
- Berkhamsted F.C., East of England
- Berliner FC Dynamo, Germany
- Blackpool F.C., North West England
- Bloomfield F.C., Northern Ireland
- Boavista F.C., Portugal
- Bohemian F.C., Ireland
- Bologna FC, Italy
- Brantwood F.C., Northern Ireland
- Brazilian Football Confederation, Brazil
- Brentford F.C., West London, England
- Bromley F.C., South East London, England
- Burnley F.C., North West England
- Bury F.C., Greater Manchester, England
- Buxton F.C., East Midlands, England

== Businesses and organizations ==
- Banco Fondo Común, a Venezuelan bank
- Beiqi Foton Motor, a Chinese car manufacturer
- Berliner Film Companie, a former German film and TV production company (2002–2009)
- Bible Fellowship Church, an American pietistic Christian sect
- Bikers for Christ, another American church
- Blackpool and The Fylde College, England

== Military ==
- Battle Force Capability, a surface combatant mission
- British Forces Cyprus, the British Armed Forces stationed in the UK sovereign base areas on the island of Cyprus
- British Free Corps, a unit comprising renegade Britons in the army of Nazi Germany
- the French acronym for a Canadian Forces base

== Places ==
- Bourgogne-Franche-Comté, a region of France
- Bellefonte Central Railroad, Pennsylvania, US
- Betty Ford Center, an addiction facility in California, US
- Business and Financial Centre, Singapore
- The Bund Finance Center, Shanghai, China

== Other uses ==
- Base One Foundation Component Library, in software development
- Beekse Fusie Club, a Dutch handball club
- Bromofluorocarbon, a chemical
- Panyi Bai, spoken in China (ISO 639-3:bfc)

== See also ==
- BFCS
