= Omagh United F.C. =

Omagh United
- Full name: Omagh United Football Club
- Founded: 2007
- Dissolved: 2010
- Ground: Athletic Park; Omagh, County Tyrone

Omagh United was a Northern Irish intermediate-level football club. The club was formed in 2007 with the aim of returning senior to Omagh, County Tyrone, following the demise of Omagh Town F.C. in 2005. The club started out as a junior team in the Fermanagh & Western League, before gaining entry to the intermediate section of the Mid-Ulster Football League the following season. Promotion to the Intermediate A Division was achieved immediately, but after only three years in existence, the club folded at the end of the 2009–10 season for financial reasons. It was managed for most of its brief history by former Omagh Town manager Roy McCreadie.
