= BAFC =

BAFC can stand for:

- Barrow Association Football Club, an English football (soccer) club
- Bangor Amateurs F.C., a Northern Irish (soccer) club
- Banstead Athletics Football Club, an English football (soccer) club
- Bishop Auckland Football Club, an English football (soccer) club
- Bradford A.F.C., commonly known as Bradford Park Avenue A.F.C.
- Burton Albion Football Club, an English football (soccer) club
- Bethesda Athletic F.C., a Welsh football club

== See also ==
- BFC (disambiguation)
