= Dunnaman F.C. =

Dunnaman
- Full name: Dunnaman Football Club
- Nickname: The men in red
- Founded: 2014
- Ground: Mourne Esplanade
- League: Mid-Ulster Football League

Dunnaman Football Club, also known simply as Dunnaman, is an intermediate-level football club playing in Division 1 of the Mid-Ulster Football League in Northern Ireland. The club is based in Kilkeel, County Down, and operates a senior team alongside a reserve team, Dunnaman Reserves, which compete in the reserve divisions. Dunnaman was established in 2014.

Dunnaman F.C. is a member of the Mid-Ulster Football Association, and the club's squads compete across regional knockout competitions, including the Mid-Ulster League Cup and Marshall Cup. They also play in the Irish Cup and IFA Junior Cup. They won the double in the 2025/26 season.

== History ==
Dunnaman started out playing in the Carnbane Football League.

After successful seasons in the Carbane League, Dunnaman joined the Mid-Ulster Football League.

In the 2023/24 season, Dunnaman, won Division 3, and made it to the John Magee Cup final at Madden Park, Tandragee. They lost 3-1 to Damolly. To top off a good season, Dunnaman Reserves won the Reserve 3 Division.

In April 2026, Dunnaman reached the Foster Cup final. They met rivals Donaghmore, and the final went to a penalty shoot-out when it finished 1-1 at fulltime. They won on penalties 8-7.

In May 2026, Dunnaman beat Glenavy with a late winner to win Division 2 of the Mid-Ulster League. They gained promotion to Division 1 for the first time in their history. This marked the team's most successful season, marking a cup double.

== Club identity ==
Dunnaman play in red and black. They play their home games at Mourne Esplanade in Kilkeel.

Dunnaman host youth development sides supporting local grassroots football for various age groups.

The Dunnaman crest depicts a heraldic red lion rampant.

The club host family days, bringing the local people together.

== Honours ==
Mid-Ulster Football League

- Division 2
  - 2025/26
- Division 3
  - 2023/24
- Foster Cup
  - 2025/26
- Reserve 3
  - 2023/24
