= FUFC =

FUFC may refer to:

- Fanad United F.C.
- Fauldhouse United F.C.
- Felda United F.C.
- Fgura United F.C.
- Fivemiletown United F.C.
- Flame United F.C.
- Formartine United F.C.
- Fraserburgh United F.C.
- Fukushima United F.C.
