= RFC =

RFC may refer to:

== Computing ==
- Request for Comments, a memorandum on Internet standards
- Request for change, change management
- Remote Function Call, in SAP computer systems
- Rhye's and Fall of Civilization, a modification for Sid Meier's Civilization IV

== Science and technology ==
- Regenerative fuel cell
- Replication factor C, a protein complex
- Radio frequency choke, a type of choke

== Organisations ==
=== Governmental ===
- Reconstruction Finance Corporation of the US government, 1932-1957
- Royal Flying Corps, precursor to the UK Royal Air Force
- River Forecast Center of the US National Weather Service

=== Non-profit ===
- Rosenberg Fund for Children, a charity

=== Sports ===
- Sports club for rugby football, a rugby football club (R.F.C.)
- Raceview F.C., a Northern Irish association football club
- Randers FC, a Danish professional football club
- Rangers F.C., a Scottish professional football club
- Ratchaburi F.C., a Thai association football club
- Rathcoole F.C., a Northern Irish association football club
- Reading F.C., an English professional football club
- Richhill F.C., a Northern Irish defunct association football club
- Richmond F.C., an English rugby union club
- Richmond Football Club, a team in the AFL, the top-level Australian rules football league
- Romulus F.C., an English semi-professional football club
- Rooftop F.C., a Northern Irish intermediate association football club

== Other uses ==
- Federal Taxpayer Registry (Spanish: Registro Federal de Contribuyentes), Mexican tax identification number
- Radio Fukushima, a radio station in Fukushima Prefecture, Japan
- Ramoji Film City

== See also ==
- List of RFCs
