= Rasharkin United F.C. =

Association football club in Northern Ireland

Rasharkin United
- Full name: Rasharkin United Football Club
- League: Ballymena & Provincial Football League

Rasharkin United Football Club were an intermediate-level football club who played in the Premier division of the Ballymena & Provincial League in Northern Ireland. The team played in the league for 13 seasons until they disbanded in 2012.
