= Hillsborough Boys F.C. =

Northern Irish Football club

Hillsborough Boys
- Full name: Hillsborough Boys Junior Football Club
- Founded: 1969
- Ground: Laurelhill Sports Zone
- League: Mid-Ulster Football League
- Website: hillsboroughboys.com

Hillsborough Boys Junior Football Club, referred to as Hillsborough Boys, are an intermediate football club that they play in Division 1 of the Mid-Ulster Football League in Northern Ireland. Hillsborough Boys are based in Lisburn. Hillsborough Boys F.C. was established in 1969 by Brian Ogle. The club, which plays in the Irish Cup, forms part of the Mid-Ulster Football Association.

Hillsborough Boys holds the Irish FA's Advanced Club Mark, which is the highest accreditation available to clubs not competing in the Northern Ireland Football League licensing system.

== History ==
Hillsborough Boys Junior Football Club were established in 1969 by founder Brian Ogle. Originally a village team, they were one of the founders of a regional league known as the Dundonald Junior League. In 1977, Hillsborough Boys won all 33 games in the league, completing a league and cup double.

The Hillsborough Boys Learning Disability Football Team finished third place in the Disability Sports Team of the Year category at the 2022 Draynes Farm Sports Personality of the Year Awards.

The club has played in various European tournaments and cup competitions. These include competitions in Denmark, Germany, Norway, Sweden and Italy. The youth teams compete in the Verona Cup, a tournament held in Lake Garda, Italy. They won the competition in 2013 and 2024.

== Club badge, ground and colours ==
Hillsborough Boys play at Laurelhill Sports Zone, and they play in red and black stripes. The training session takes place at Hillsborough Boys' Football Factory.

In June 2025, a new 3G pitch facility opened at Laurelhill sports zone after the Lisburn City and Castlereagh Council approved the plans for the £1.7 million investment. The construction was carried out by John McQuillan Contracts, which started in 2024.

== Academy ==
Hillsborough Boys FC has 26 youth teams, which allow boys and girls to take part between the ages of 11–19. These youth sides train on a weekly basis. They also host summer camps for children.

A number of players within the league have gone on to play professionally. These include Northern Ireland internationals, such as Neil Lennon and Gerry Taggart.

Vivian Campbell, the guitarist currently with Def Leppard and formerly of Whitesnake and Thin Lizzy, played football for Hillsborough Boys youth side in the early 1970s.

== Media ==
The Hillsborough Boys Podcast features Director of Football Justin Sheppard discussing the club's history and its future. Founder Brian Ogle also featured on the first episode.

== Honours ==
Irish Football Association

- Irish FA Advanced Club Mark
  - 2018

Mid-Ulster Football League

- Mid Ulster League Cup
  - 2022/23
- Foyle Cup
  - 2023/24
- Reserve 4
  - 2018/19

Dundonald Junior League

- League
  - 1977
- Dundonald Cup
  - 1977

Lisburn and Castlereagh City Council

- Lisburn & Castlereagh Shield
  - 2017/18

European Youth Tournaments

- Verona Cup
  - 2013, 2024
