= Lisburn Rovers F.C. =

Lisburn Rovers
- Full name: Lisburn Rovers Football Club
- Nicknames: The Dons, Rovers
- Founded: 1991
- Ground: Queen Elizabeth Playing Fields
- Chairman: Johnny Kerr
- League: Mid-Ulster Football League

Lisburn Rovers Football Club, commonly known by their nickname "The Dons" or simply Lisburn Rovers, is an intermediate-level football club playing in the Mid-Ulster Football League in Northern Ireland. The club's senior team is known as Lisburn Rovers Seniors, while the youth setup is known as Lisburn Rovers Juniors. The Lisburn Rovers reserves compete in the Mid-Ulster Reserves League.

Lisburn Rovers was founded in 1991 and are based in Ballymacoss, Lisburn, County Antrim. The Dons are a member of the Mid-Ulster Football Association, and the club's senior team play in the IFA Junior Cup and the Irish Cup.

Lisburn Rovers Visual Impairment Football Club is a futsal team compete in various tournaments in Europe and the UK League.

== History ==
The Dons was founded in 1991 in the area of Ballymacoss, Lisburn, County Antrim. They joined the local Lisburn League. In 1994, they reached the Leader Shield final, and lost 4-1. Don McMahon managed them for 22 years.

In 2013, Lisburn Rovers reached the Mid-Ulster Magee Cup final, their first senior cup final in 19 years. They lost the match at Crewe United on penalties.

In 2015, the club's visually impaired futsal team won the Partially Sighted Football League. They secured the UK league with a 4-3 victory against Birmingham. Team Captain Niall Dempsey was awarded with league player of the year.

In 2016, the futsal team competed in the visually impaired futsal international tournament in County Dublin.

In June 2018, the Lisburn Rovers Visual Impairment youth team won the inaugural Jordan’s Gift Junior Cup at Stormont.

In 2019, coach Kym Mulholland was awarded at the IFA Regional Awards for his contribution to local grassroots football.

In the 2022/23 season, Lisburn Rovers Seniors won Mid-Ulster Division 3. In the run-up to the title, they faced Warren Young Men in a Lisburn derby, beating them 16-1 in a record victory. Striker Chris Edgar scored eight goals in the match.

Johnny Kerr was announced as the chairman in July 2024.

== Club identity and ground ==
The Dons play their home games at Queen Elizabeth Playing Fields in Ballymacoss. Their home kit is red and black and their away kit is all black. The clubs crest shows the clubs name "The Dons" and it's initials DFC for Dons F.C.

Lisburn Rovers visually impaired futsal team compete at the Lisburn Leisureplex. They also have a youth side.

Lisburn Rovers Juniors Football club has facilities for young boys and girls for coaching and training. The youth teams compete in the Lisburn & Castlereagh Junior League and play under the nickname "the colts".

== Honours ==
Mid-Ulster Football League

- Division 3
  - 2022/23

Irish Football Association

- IFA Regional Awards
- Contribution to local grassroots football
  - 2019 - Kym Mulholland

Futsal

- Partially Sighted Football League
  - 2015
