= Ballyoran F.C. =

Ballyoran
- Full name: Ballyoran Football Club
- Founded: 1974
- Ground: Portadown People's Park
- League: Mid-Ulster Football League

Ballyoran Football Club, or referred to simply as Ballyoran, is an intermediate-level football club who play in the Mid-Ulster Football League in Northern Ireland. The club is based in Portadown, Northern Ireland. Ballyoran was founded in 1974. They play their home games at Portadown People's Park. Ballyoran F.C. are a part of the Mid-Ulster Football Association. The club plays in the Irish Cup.

Ballyoran's home colours are red and white, their away kit is in black. The Ballyoran Reserves play in the Mid Ulster Reserves League.

== Honours ==
Mid-Ulster Football League

Senior team

- Leagues
  - Division 1: 2019/20
- Cup competitions
  - Gerald Kennedy Cup: 2017-18, 2019-20
  - Mid Ulster Shield: 2015/16

Reserves team

- Leagues
  - Reserve 1: 2019/20
  - Reserve 2: 2016/17
