= Armagh Blues F.C. =

Armagh Blues
- Full name: Armagh Blues Football Club
- Nickname: The Blues
- Founded: 2007
- Ground: Kingston Memorial Playing Field
- Chairman: David Nesbitt
- League: Mid-Ulster Football League
- Website: armaghblues.atspace.com

Armagh Blues Football Club, commonly referred to as Armagh Blues, is an intermediate-level football club playing in the Mid-Ulster Football League in Northern Ireland. Founded in 2007, the club are based in Armagh, County Armagh. The club is a member of the Mid-Ulster Football Association and is eligible to compete in the IFA Junior Cup and the Irish Cup, as well as regional cups such as the Marshall Cup and the Beckett Cup.

They currently compete in Division 2 as of the 2025/26 season.

== Club identity ==
Armagh Blues play their home games at Kingston Memorial Playing Field. The club's home kit colours are blue and white. Their away kit colours are navy and white. The club's crest depicts the Red Hand of Ulster symbol.

In 2021, the club's home ground received a £100,000 investment as part of Armagh City, Banbridge and Craigavon Borough Council's £4.75m Play Strategy 2018–2026.

== Committee ==
The committee-led structure oversees both senior and junior developmental teams.

- Chairman: David Nesbitt
- Vice Chairman: David Gillis
- Secretary: Richard Palmer
- Treasurer: David Nesbitt
- Committee Members:-Tommy Crowe, Ross Law, Dean Morrison, George Calvin

== Honours ==
Mid-Ulster Football League

- Division 2
  - 2019/20
