= DHFC =

DHFC may refer to:

- David Horowitz Freedom Center in California
- Donard Hospital F.C., Northern Ireland
- Dulwich Hamlet Football Club in London
