= Ivor Jess =

Ivor Jess MBE is a Northern Irish disability sports campaigner from Glenavy, County Antrim. Jess plays a range of sports, including wheelchair basketball with the Knights Basketball team in Antrim. He also founded the Freewheelers cycle ride, the wheelchair tennis group Spokes in Motion based at Ormeau and Ski Ability in Craigavon.

He began playing wheelchair sport after a spinal injury at the age of 29. The injury occurred from a cycling accident while Jess was preparing for a fundraising ride in aid of research into kidney disease. Since his injury, he has organised the event as the annual Freewheelers Lough Neagh Charity Cycle in aid of disability sport. He has raised over £100,000 for Disability Sport in Northern Ireland.

An electrician by training, Jess works as a health and safety officer with Stoneyford Concrete. He is married to Karen and has two daughters, Angelina and Megan.

He was awarded the MBE in the 2011 New Year’s Honours list, for services to disability sport in Northern Ireland. Disability Sports NI said Jess had made a “massive contribution” to playing, promoting and fundraising for disability sport in Northern Ireland.

In 2012, Jess took part in the torch relay for the London 2012 Paralympic Games.

He is team captain for Northern Ireland wheelchair tennis at the 2015 School Games in Manchester
