= Hill Street F.C. =

Hill Street
- Full name: Hill Street Football Club
- Founded: 1973
- Ground: St Patrick's 3G
- Chairman: Gary Topley
- Manager: Simon Kennedy
- League: Mid-Ulster Football League

Hill Street Football Club, referred to as Hill Street, is an intermediate-level football club playing in the Mid-Ulster Football League in Northern Ireland. Hill Street were established in 1973. They are based in Lurgan, County Armagh. The Hill Street Reserves compete in the Mid-Ulster Reserve Division one.

Hill Street are known for their decorated history in Mid-Ulster football. Hill Street are a part of the Mid Ulster Football Association. The club plays in the Irish Cup.

The club play their home games at St Patrick's 3G on Scarva Road, Banbridge. They play in sky blue.

== History ==
In 1973, Hill Street Football Club was established from a clubhouse in Hill Street to provide a new focus for young people in the area.

Hill Street's biggest cup victories came in 1996 and 2005, lifting the IFA Junior Cup.

In 2006, Hill Street were the inaugural winners of the O'Hara Cup.

In June 2014, Hill Street F.C. winger Dwayne-Andrew Kerr was named "Mr. Northern Ireland" at the Mr World competition after representing his country.

In 2017, Hill Street clinched the Division 1 league title for the third time in four seasons.

Marking a double celebration in 2024, Hill Street received a Civic Reception from Deputy Lord Mayor of Armagh City, Banbridge and Craigavon Cllr Kyle Savage. The reception honored the club's 50th Anniversary and their success in winning the Mid Ulster League Division One trophy.

== Honours ==
Irish Football Association

- IFA Junior Cup
  - 1995/96, 2004/05

Mid-Ulster Football League

- Division 1
  - 1996/97, 2003/04, 2004/05, 2007/08, 2013/14, 2014/15, 2016/17, 2017/18, 2023/24
- Alexandra Cup
  - 2002/03, 2003/04, 2014/15
- O'Hara Cup
  - 2005/06
- Mid Ulster League Cup
  - 2018/19, 2024/2025
- Mid-Ulster Shield
- 1996/97, 1997/98, 2001/02, 2002/03, 2003/04
- Gerald Kennedy Memorial Cup
  - 2000/01, 2015/16, 2025/26
