= Rectory Rangers F.C. =

Association football club in Northern Ireland

Rectory Ranger
- Full name: Rectory Rangers Football Club
- Ground: Brownstown Park, Portadown
- League: Mid-Ulster Football League Intermediate B
- 22/23: 7th

Rectory Rangers Football Club is an intermediate-level football club playing in the Intermediate B division of the Mid-Ulster Football League in Northern Ireland. They play home games at Brownstown Park in Portadown, County Armagh. The club, which plays in the Irish Cup, forms part of the Mid-Ulster Football Association.
