= Lurgan BBOB F.C. =

Lurgan BBOB
- Full name: Lurgan Boys' Brigade Old Boys Football Club
- Nicknames: Lurgan Old Boys, The Old Boys
- Founded: 1988
- Ground: Gordon Playing Fields
- League: Mid-Ulster Football League

Lurgan Boys' Brigade Old Boys Football Club, commonly referred to as Lurgan BBOB F.C., and also known by the nickname "The Old Boys" or "Lurgan Old Boys", is an intermediate-level football club playing in the Mid-Ulster Football League in Northern Ireland. Founded in 1988, the club was originally formed as a team for the "Old Boys" members of the Lurgan Boys' Brigade companies after aging out. The club is based in Lurgan, County Armagh, and currently operates two senior men's teams. The first team compete in Division 2, while the reserves compete in Reserve 2.

As a member of the Mid-Ulster Football Association, the club is eligible to compete in national competitions, including the Irish Cup and the IFA Junior Cup. They compete in Mid-Ulster competitions, such as the Mid-Ulster Shield and the Foster Cup, the latter of which they have won three times.

== Club identity and ground ==
Lurgan Old Boys work closely with local BB companies. The club publishes its own news sheet and regularly hold fundraisers.

Lurgan BBOB, alongside other teams established a "soccer 7's" seven-a-side league.

Lurgan Old Boys play in white and royal blue. The club's crest is the global emblem of the Boy's Brigade, which has the typical anchor and quote "Sure & Steadfast". They play their home games at Gordon Playing Fields on Glenavon Lane.

Noel Hayes was Lurgan BBOB President as well as Glenavon F.C. club director. The club paid tribute to Hayes after his death in 2021.

== Honours ==
Mid-Ulster Football League

- Foster Cup
  - 1998/99, 1999/00, 2012/13
