= Castlecaulfield F.C. =

Castlecaulfield
- Full name: Castlecaulfield Football Club
- Nickname: The Caulfield
- Ground: Castlecaulfield Playing Fields
- League: Mid-Ulster Football League

Castlecaulfield Football Club, referred to by their nickname "The Caulfield", is an intermediate-level football club competing in the Mid-Ulster Football League in Northern Ireland. The club is based in the village of Castlecaulfield, County Tyrone, and has three senior men's teams, with the first team playing in Division 3 and the reserves playing in Reserve 2. The third team compete in the Carbane League.

As a member of the Mid-Ulster Football Association, Castlecaulfield's senior squad also competes in their regional cups, as well as the Irish Cup. The club's most successful season came in 2005, after winning the Foster Cup in the previous season, they went on to win Division 2 and retain the Foster Cup, ending the 2004/05 season doing the double.

== Academy ==
Castlecaulfield has a youth academy known as Castlecaulfield Youth F.C. for boys and girls of all ages.

Castlecaulfield host their own invitational tournament for youth teams, as well as the Castlecaulfield Cup.

In 2025, the youth team won Club of the Year and the coach, Chris Morrow won the Wes Gregg Coach of the Year at the Irish FA Grassroots Football Awards.

== Club identity, colours and crest ==
The Caulfield play their home games in orange and black. Their away kits are all black. The club play their home games at Castlecaulfield Playing Fields.

The Castlecaulfield crest shows Castlecaulfield Castle, a 17th-century State Care Historic Monument that is embedded into the history of the village. Above is a silhouette of a white fallow deer, which are found near the village. The rare herd are located within Parkanaur Forest Park.

== Honours ==
Mid-Ulster Football League

- Division 2
  - 2004/05
- Foster Cup
  - 2003/04, 2004/05

Irish Football Association

- Irish FA Grassroots Football Awards
  - Club of the Year - 2025
- Wes Gregg Coach of the Year
  - Chris Morrow - 2025
