= Broomhill F.C. =

Broomhill
- Full name: Broomhill Football Club
- Founded: 1977 merged with Richhill F.C. 2016
- Ground: Richhill Recreation Centre

Broomhill Football Club was a Northern Irish football club based in Richhill, County Armagh, which last played in the Intermediate Division A of the Mid-Ulster Football League. The club was founded in 1977, but merged in 2016 with Richhill to form Richhill A.F.C. Club colours are orange and blue.

The club participated in the Irish Cup.
