= Alvin Rouse =

Barbadian footballer

Personal information
- Full name: Alvin Rouse
- Date of birth: 13 August 1982 (age 44)
- Place of birth: Barbados
- Height: 1.95 m (6 ft 5 in)
- Position: Goalkeeper

Senior career*
Years	Team	Apps	(Gls)
1999–2003	Barbados Defence Force SC		
2004–2005	Sligo Rovers	22	(0)
2006–2007	Barbados Defence Force SC		
2007	Macclesfield Town	1	(0)
2007	Flixton	3	(0)
2007	Monaghan United	27	(0)
2008	Galway United	3	(0)
2009–2010	Dungannon Swifts	50	(0)
2011	Longford Town	10	(0)
2012–2014	Ballinamallard United	56	(0)
2014–2015	Dungannon Swifts	5	(0)
2015–2016	Ballinamallard United	25	(0)
2019-2021	Fivemiletown United	25	(0)
2025	Monaghan Town	?	(?)

International career
2006–2010	Barbados	21	(0)
- * Club domestic league appearances and goals

Alvin Rouse (born 13 August 1982) is a former Barbadian footballer who most recently played as a goalkeeper for Fivemiletown United F.C.

== Club career ==
From 1999 to 2003 he played for Barbados Defence Force SC in his native homeland, before signing for League of Ireland club Sligo Rovers in 2004. He left Rovers in 2005, and played for several other clubs including Macclesfield Town, Flixton, Monaghan United and Galway United, before signing for IFA Premiership club Dungannon Swifts in January 2009. In October 2009 it was reported Rouse was the victim of racist abuse from fans of Ballymena United.The club were fined by the IFA, although Ballymena United appeal the fine. Rouse left Dungannon at the end of the 2010 season after deciding to return home to Barbados. In his short time with the club, Rouse established himself as a fans favourite and the Swifts number one keeper with performances that got him recognised as one of the best goalkeepers in the league.

On 8 January 2011, it was confirmed that Rouse would be returning to the League of Ireland to play for Longford Town, but left the club at the end of the season.

In June 2012, he returned to the IFA Premiership, and signed a contract with Ballinamallard United, as the newly promoted Fermanagh based club looked to strengthen their squad for their first season in the top flight. Rouse had been without a club since leaving Longford in 2011. After 2 seasons at Ferney Park Alvin Rouse was released from the club

In May 2015, Rouse rejoined Ballinamallard United. He left the club in 2016 after budget cuts meant the club could no longer afford his wages.

On 14 June 2019 Rouse signed for Mid Ulster Intermediate A side Fivemiletown United F.C. After spending two seasons in the Valley. Rouse retired after picking up a knee injury he decided to call it a day on a fantastic playing career.

== International career ==
Rouse made his debut for Barbados in a September 2006 friendly match against Guyana. He has so far made 19 appearances for the national side.
