= Moneyslane F.C. =

Moneyslane
- Full name: Moneyslane Football Club
- Nicknames: Blue and white army, Slane
- Founded: 1983
- Stadium: Jubilee Park
- Manager: Matthew Jackson
- League: Mid-Ulster Football League

Moneyslane Football Club, referred to as Moneyslane, or "Slane" for short, are an intermediate-level football club playing in the Mid-Ulster Football League in Northern Ireland. They play in the Intermediate "A" league, the top tier of the MUFL. Moneyslane is also a member of the Mid-Ulster Football Association. Moneyslane F.C. was founded in 1983, and is based in the village of Moneyslane, County Down.

Moneyslane have three men's senior teams, and a senior ladies team. The two reserves team are known as the Moneyslane Swifts, they play in the Mid-Ulster Reserves League. Moneyslane Ladies F.C., play in the NIWFA Division 3 League. They also have a boys and girls youth academy. The club's senior team plays in the Irish Cup.

The Moneyslane first team manager is Matthew Jackson, who is a former player. He previously managed the Moneyslane Swifts.

== History ==
Moneyslane F.C. were founded in 1983, in the village of Moneyslane.

Moneyslane reached their first cup final in 2009. Moneyslane won the Mid-Ulster Division 3 in 2010, when they secured the league by beating Caledon Rovers 7–1. They ended the season by completing a cup-double, beating A.F.C. Craigavon in the Beckett Cup final, marking their first cup victory in their history.

They then achieved back-to-back promotions, going on to win Division 2 in 2011.

In January 2012, Moneyslane saw their biggest recorded league crowd-draw, when 800 supporters turned up to watch them in their derby against Banbridge Rangers. 800 supporters attended the match, a figure significantly higher than the village's population of 150. They were narrowly beaten 2–1. The 2012 season saw strong performances from youth and senior sides. This includes the U-11s beating derby rivals Rathfriland in the Youth League Cup final 1–0 to clinch their first trophy. Their end-of-season awards and dinner dance was held in Banbridge Orange Hall.

In December 2012, at the BBC Sports Personality of the Year ceremony, Leonard Bleakley was named as the winner of the BBC Sport Unsung Hero Award for Northern Ireland. Leonard was recognized for his significant and multi-faceted service to Moneyslane Football Club. He is a founding member of the club and holds multiple administrative roles, including coordinator for junior football, media officer, and child welfare officer. Furthermore, he oversees more than 200 training sessions annually and was instrumental in coordinating the successful fundraising of £60,000 for the development of the club's new 3G training pitch. He thanked the club, saying “I accept the award not only for myself but in recognition of the many hours put in by all the staff of Moneyslane F.C. who provide the opportunity for members of the community, from children under the age of six through to adults, to participate in and enjoy a sport that they love."

In 2013, Bleakley won the Outstanding Contribution to football awards at the IFA Community Awards.

In 2015, Moneyslane won the Alan Wilson Cup for the first time in their history. They beat Bourneview Mill 1–0 at Crystal Park. Manager David Johnstone lead Moneyslane to promotion the intermediate A.

In August 2015, a match was organized between Manchester United legends and a Moneyslane select team at Jubilee Park to mark the new development of the club's stadium. The match drew the biggest crowd in history at Jubilee Park, with over 2,500 spectators.

== Club identity and youth structure ==
Moneyslane play their home games at Jubilee Park, located on the Moneyslane Road. Their home kit colours are blue and white. Their away kit is black. Their fans are known as the "blue and white army". The badge feature the word "Millstone", which pays homage to the village's industrial heritage.

Moneyslane hold annual summer camps for children getting into football. Moneyslane Youth Development centre was set up in 2012. This was due to a fundraising-effort by the club, raising £60,000.

== Honours ==
Mid-Ulster Football League

- Intermediate A Champions
  - 2025-26
- Intermefiade Division 1 (Promoted)
  - 2015-16
- Division 2
  - 2010–11
- Division 3
  - 2009–10
- Reserve 2
  - 2014–15
- Reserve 3
  - 2013–14, 2019–20
- Premier Cup
  - 2025-26
- Alan Wilson Cup
  - 2014–15
- Beckett Cup
  - 2009–10
- O'Hara Cup
  - 2014–15 (runners-up)

BBC Sport

- BBC Unsung Hero NI
  - 2012 - Leonard Bleakley

Irish Football Association

- Irish FA Community Awards
  - Outstanding Contribution to football
    - 2013 - Leonard Bleakley
