= Cookstown Olympic F.C. =

Association football club in Northern Ireland

Cookstown Olympic
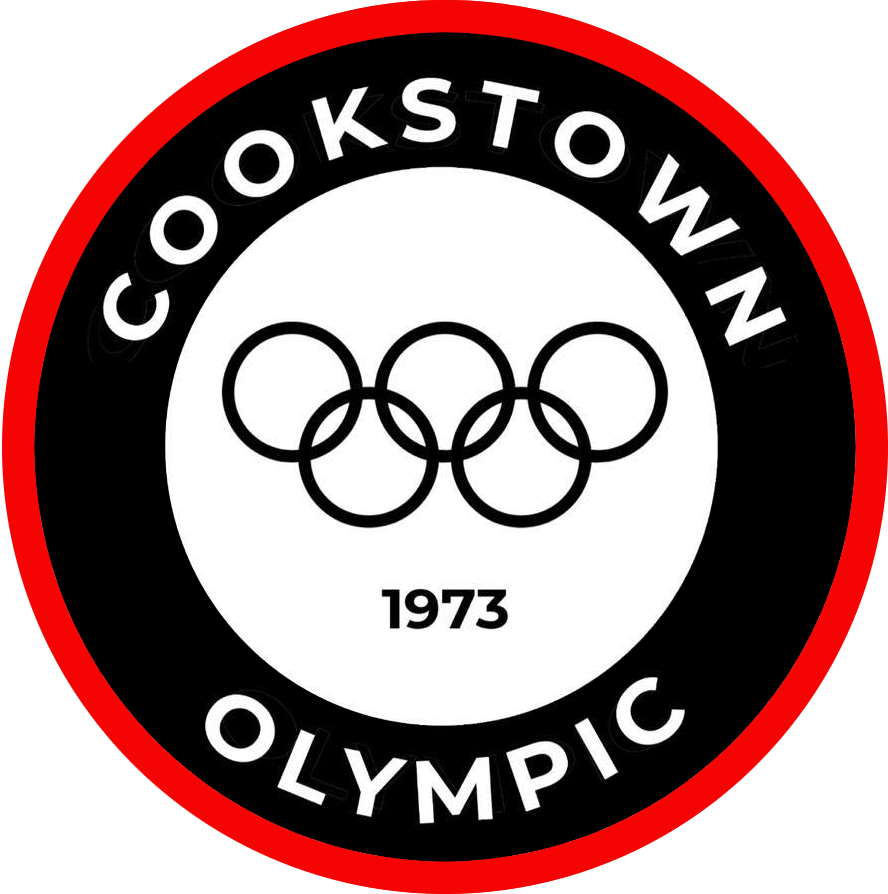
- Full name: Cookstown Olympic Football Club
- Founded: 1973

Cookstown Olympic F. C. is an amateur football club that formerly played in the Premier Division of the Ballymena & Provincial League in Northern Ireland. The club hails from Cookstown, County Tyrone. As of the 2026 season, the club were playing in division 2 of the Mid-Ulster Football League.

== See also ==
- Northern Ireland football league system
