= Richhill A.F.C. =

Association football club in Northern Ireland

- Full name: Richhill Amalgamated Football Club
- Founded: 2016
- Ground: Richhill Recreation Centre
- League: Mid-Ulster Football League Intermediate A
- 2022/23: 7th
Home colours

Richhill Amalgamated Football Club is an intermediate level football club playing in the Intermediate A division of the Mid-Ulster Football League in Northern Ireland. The club was founded in 2016 following the amalgamation of Richhill F.C. and Broomhill F.C.. The club, which is associated with the Mid-Ulster Football Association, is based in Richhill, County Armagh. It competes in the Irish Cup where it progressed to the Fifth Round in their first season in the competition.

In addition to the successful Irish Cup run, Richhill AFC won the Mid-Ulster Intermediate B league title and the Alan Wilson Cup in the club's debut season.
