= 2-Phospho-L-lactate guanylyltransferase =

Class of enzymes

Identifiers
- EC no.: 2.7.7.68

Databases
- BRENDA: enzyme data
- ExPASy: NiceZyme view
- KEGG: enzyme entry
- MetaCyc: metabolic pathway
- Rhea: reactions
- PDB structures: RCSB PDB PDBe PDBsum
Search
- PMC: articles
- PubMed: articles
- NCBI: proteins

2-Phospho-L-lactate guanylyltransferase (EC 2.7.7.68, CofC, MJ0887) is an enzyme with systematic name GTP:2-phospho-L-lactate guanylyltransferase. This enzyme catalyses the following chemical reaction

2-phospho-L-lactic acid
+
guanosine triphosphate
PP_{i}
L-lactyl-2-diphospho-5'-guanosine

Coenzyme F420

The enzyme characterised from methanogenic archaea and Paraburkholderia rhizoxinica combines 2-phospho-L-lactic acid and guanosine triphosphate to give L-lactyl-2-diphospho-5'-guanosine, with pyrophosphate (PP_{i}) as a byproduct. The reaction is part of the biosynthesis of coenzyme F420.
