= Carryduff Colts F.C. =

Carryduff Colts
- Full name: Carryduff Colts Football Club
- Nickname: The Colts
- Founded: 2003
- Ground: Lough Moss
- Owner: committee of officials
- Chairman: Jake McKeown
- Manager: Stephen Smith
- League: Northern Amateur Football League
- Website: carryduffcolts.com

Carryduff Colts Football Club, referred to simply as Carryduff, or "The Colts", is a Northern Irish, intermediate football club playing in the Northern Amateur Football League. The club is based in Carryduff, County Down, and was formed in 2003. The club plays in the Irish Cup.

Carryduff play their home games Lough Moss, and their home colours are blue and yellow. Carryduff have three reserves teams, the II's play in the NAFL reserves league. They also have a range of women's teams and youth teams.

== Honours ==
- Irish Football Association
  - Irish FA McDonald's Grassroots Football Award
    - 2024
- South Belfast Youth League
  - Burrell Cup
    - 2021/22
