= Raceview F.C. =

Association football club in Northern Ireland

Raceview FC
- Full name: Raceview Football Club
- Nickname: The View
- Ground: Broughshane Community Centre
- Chairman: William Hunter
- Manager: Gareth Mott
- League: Ballymena Saturday Morning League
- 2023 / 2024: 1
Home colours	Away colours

Raceview Football Club is a junior-level club playing in the Ballymena Saturday Morning League in Northern Ireland. The club, based in the village of Broughshane, dropped into junior football from Intermediate Football for the 2013–14 season. Raceview previously enjoyed intermediate status and participation in the Irish Cup. One of the club's greatest achievements came in 2002 by winning the County Antrim FA Junior Shield.

== Honours ==
=== Junior Honours ===
County Antrim Junior Shield: 1

BSML Division 1: 4

BSML Division 2: 2

BSML Division 3: 1

Okane Cup: 3

Top 4 Cup: 4

Rainey Cup: 3

Ace Cup: 2

=== Intermediate honours ===
- Ballymena & Provincial Intermediate League: 4

Crawford Cup: 2

O'gorman Cup: 3
