= Laurelvale F.C. =

Association football club in Northern Ireland

Laurelvale
- Full name: Laurelvale Football Club
- Nickname: The Vale
- Founded: 1980
- Ground: Sid Wright Park
- Manager: Mark Topley
- League: Mid-Ulster Football League Intermediate A
- 2023/2024: Mid-Ulster Football League Intermediate B, 1st (Promoted)
Home colours	Away colours

Laurelvale Football Club is an intermediate-level football club with its first team playing in the Intermediate A division and second team playing in the Reserve Division 2 of the Mid-Ulster Football League in Northern Ireland. The club, which is based in the rural village of Laurelvale, County Armagh, forms part of the Mid-Ulster Football Association.

== History ==
In their 25th anniversary year (2005–06 season), Laurelvale won the Intermediate League in addition to the Marshall Cup. The club also reached the last 16 in the Irish Intermediate Cup and defeated senior Irish Premier League sides, Armagh City and Loughgall (31–01–06) on their way to the semi-final of the Mid-Ulster Cup, where they lost to Glenavon.

In the following season (2006–07), Laurelvale won the Premier Cup. Mark Robinson's second team also won the Mid Ulster Reserve League Division 3 on the final day of the season. The first team reached the fifth round of the Irish Cup.

In the 2011–2012 season, Laurelvale were hit by their first relegation to the second tier.

For the 2012–2013 season, Mark Robinson was back at the helm to try and get the team back into the top tier but could only manage an 11th-place finish. The next season the league form did improve with the club finishing mid-table, but the real achievement was in the Mid-Ulster Cup where the team came up against Irish Premier League side, Glenavon and only narrowly losing 1–0.

After a few mediocre years, Mark Robinson updated the backroom staff and brought in Darragh Pedan at the beginning of the 2016–2017 season. The club finished 11th that season. On 9 June 2017, the lifetime supporter and "club legend" Sid Wright died. This led to the renaming of the ground in the future. With a high turnover of players during the summer, signing 9 players, there was a confidence within the club that it could be a successful season. At the start of the season, the club reached the 3rd round of the Irish Cup, falling to Moyola Park, as well as sitting top of the table. Adding another two players to see them over the line and return to the top tier on the second last day of the season beating Seagoe 1–0. On the final day of the season, when the team lifted the trophy, they revealed a banner reading 'WE DID IT FOR SID'.

Upon the return to Intermediate 'A' football, The Vale lost coach Darragh Peden who was instrumental in the title winning season. He was replaced by ex-Crusaders player Sid Burrows. Despite adding two experienced faces to the squad, the team was overwhelmed by the step up in quality and just about survived the drop finishing 12th.

As for the 2019–2020 season, The Vale was saved by the bell more or less with the team sat rock bottom when the league was suspended due to the COVID-19 pandemic. Sid Burrows left the club and was replaced by George McAllister at the beginning of the 2019–2020 season.

The COVID-19 pandemic allowed Mark Robinson to bow out with the club still an Intermediate 'A' outfit and a project waiting to be took on. He was replaced by ex-Portadown centre forward Gary Millar. Millar brought with him Robin Carson as his assistant as well as Matthew Hollis, Aaron Dowey and Gareth Thornbury joining the coaching staff. With training and matches interrupted, Millar left his post after only 9 games in charge with the club promoting his assistant Robin Carson to manager. Gareth Thornbury also left the club. At the end of the season, the team found themselves heading back down to the second tier after finishing 15th. Aaron Dowey left the club at the end of the season.

At the start of the 2022–2023 season, Carson added Trevor Grant to the backroom team for the upcoming Intermediate 'B' season. In the 2023-2024 season, Laurelvale were crowned champions of Intermediate 'B' and returned to Intermediate 'A' for the 2024-2025 season.

== Club colours ==
The club take its club colours from the English football club Newcastle United.

== Honours ==
=== Intermediate honours ===
- Mid-Ulster Football League: 2
  - 2002–03, 2005–06
- Mid Ulster Intermediate B: 2
  - 2018–19, 2023–24
