= Moira Albion F.C. =

Football club in Northern Ireland

Moira Albion
- Full name: Moira Albion Football Club
- Nickname: The Albion
- Founded: 1977
- Ground: Moira Demesne
- Chairman: Brian Graham
- League: Mid-Ulster Football League

Moira Albion Football Club, also known simply as Moira Albion, Albion or Moira, is an intermediate-level football club playing in Division 3 of the Mid-Ulster Football League in Northern Ireland. The club is based in Moira, County Down, and operates a senior team alongside a two reserve teams, one competes in the Mid-Ulster reserve divisions and the other competes in the Fermanagh & Western Football League. Moira Albion was established in 1977.

Moira Albion F.C. is a member of the Mid-Ulster Football Association, and the club's squads compete across regional knockout competitions, including the Mid-Ulster League Cup, Mid-Ulster Shield, and Foster Cup. They also play in national knockout competitions such as the IFA Junior Cup and the Irish Cup.

Albion completed a Mid-Ulster double, were they were Division 2 champions and Gerald Kennedy Cup winners in 2002.

== Club identity and ground ==
Moira Albion play their home games at Moira Demesne, on Main Street. They play in maroon and sky-blue.

Moira Albion host a developmental setup supporting local grassroots football and fundraisers for various age groups. They have youth teams fielded in the Lisburn Junior Invitational League.

Moira Albion's derby rivals are Magheralin Village F.C.

== Honours ==
Mid-Ulster Football League

- Division 2
  - 2001/02
- Foster Cup
  - 1990

Mid-Ulster Football Association

- Gerald Kennedy Memorial Cup
  - 2002
