= Markethill Swifts F.C. =

Association football club in Northern Ireland

Markethill Swifts
- Full name: Markethill Swifts Football Club
- Founded: 1989
- Ground: Kilcluney
- League: Mid-Ulster Football League Intermediate A

Markethill Swifts Football Club is an intermediate-level football club playing in the Intermediate A division of the Mid-Ulster Football League in Northern Ireland. The club, which is based in Markethill, County Armagh, forms part of the Mid-Ulster Football Association.
