= Roe Rovers F.C. =

Association football club in Northern Ireland

Roe Rovers
- Full name: Roe Rovers Football Club
- Founded: 1998
- Ground: Scroggy Road
- League: Northern Ireland Intermediate League

Roe Rovers Football Club is a Northern Irish football club based in Limavady, County Londonderry, formerly playing in the Northern Ireland Intermediate League. The club was founded in 1998.

The club has participated in the Irish Cup.
