= Certificate of Formula Compliance =

International trade document

A Certificate of Formula Compliance (often abbreviated to COFC) is a document used primarily for Health and Beauty Products in international trade.

Unlike a Certificate of Origin (which traditionally states from what country the shipped goods originate, but "originate" in a CO does not mean the country the goods are shipped from, but the country where their goods are actually made.)a COFC is a document that states to the Import Authority that the Products are certified accurate to the Formula that is on record in the Country of Importation.

Unlike a Certificate of Analysis(a Document used to detail the exact formula of the product being tested) a COFC states that the product in question conforms exactly to the formula of record.

A COFC is a new compliance document that has not been universally adopted as a standard for International Trade. There is a push to include its use and using it even in a Country that has not formally adopted its use has helped speed the inspection process.

One of other International Documents used in International trade:

== See also ==
- Certificate of Origin
