= Clonduff F.C. =

Northern Irish football club

Clonduff
- Full name: Clonduff Football Club
- Founded: 1968
- Ground: Avoneil Leisure Centre
- League: Northern Amateur Football League

Clonduff Football Club, or referred to simply as Clonduff, are a Northern Irish football club based in Clonduff, County Down, Northern Ireland. Clonduff F.C. were founded in 1968, and they play in the Northern Amateur Football League. Clonduff are a part of the County Antrim & District FA. The club play in the Irish Cup.

Clonduff II's play in the NAFL reserves league. They play their home games at Avoneil Leisure Centre. The youth teams play in the South Belfast Youth League.

== History ==
Clonduff were admitted into the Northern Amateur Football League in 2023 for the 2023/24 season. They had previously played in the Down Area Winter Football League previously, following multi-cup success. This includes a double trophy winning season in 2022.

Clonduff reached the final of the Cochrane Corry Cup in April 2025, but lost out to Cregagh Wanderers.

== Honours ==
- Northern Amateur Football League
  - Cochrane Corry Cup
    - Runners-up 2024/25
- Down Area Winter Football League
  - Division 1
    - 2015/16
  - Mervyn Bassett Cup Winners
    - 2021/22, 2022/23
  - Billy Allen Memorial Shield
    - 2021/22
  - Tommy Murphy Memorial Shield
    - 2018/19, 2017/18
  - Dennis S. Nash Charity Shield
    - 2022
  - Reserve Division 1
    - 2021/22
