= Ballyvea F.C. =

Ballyvea
- Full name: Ballyvea Football Club
- Nickname: The Mourne Men
- Founded: 1976
- Ground: Mountview Park
- Chairman: Trevor McConnell
- League: Mid-Ulster Football League

Ballyvea Football Club, referred to commonly as Ballyvea F.C., and also by their nickname "The Mourne Men," is an intermediate-level football club playing in the Mid-Ulster Football League in Northern Ireland. Ballyvea F.C. was founded in 1976. The club is based in Kilkeel, County Down, and have three senior men's teams. They also have a youth academy with teams for various age groups for boys and girls.

Ballyvea is a member of the Mid-Ulster Football Association, and the club's senior team compete in the national cup, the Irish Cup. The club had competed with success in the Newcastle & District League before moving on to the more competitive Mid-Ulster Football League in 2018.

== History ==
The club was formed in 1976 by Ivan McCavery, Trevor McConnell and Lewis Bennet. The following year, Ballyvea won their first trophy, the Dalzell Cup. The final took place in Annalong, winning 5–1 against Castlewellan. Founder Lewis Bennet scored a hat-trick. They ended the season as second division champions, marking a cup double.

Ballyvea reserves debuted in the 1981 season. In the IFA Junior Cup, Ballyvea caused a major upset beating Annalong in extra time. This was the club's highest-attended home match at the time.

In 2018, Ballyvea joined the Mid-Ulster Football League. This came after finishing the 2017/18 season as double winners.

== Club identity, academy and ground ==
Ballyvea FC play their home games at Mountview Park on Carrigenagh Road. Their home kit colors are navy and red, with their away kit being blue and white. The club crest depicts the Mourne Mountains.

In 2021, the club developed the Ballyvea FC New Community Hub after receiving a £270,000 grant DAERA and the Rural Development Programme. The Irish FA president and Politician Edwin Poots visited the site for the opening. The club chairman Trevor McConnell thanked everyone involved for the support.

The club hold an annual summer football tournament for the youth teams starting from under-7's.

== Honours ==
Mid-Ulster Football League

Newcastle & District League

- First Division
  - Multiple
- Second Division
  - 1977
- Newcastle League Cup
  - 1989
- Dalzell Cup
  - 1977, 1979
- Harry Clarke Cup
  - 1981
- Kitroom Cup
  - 2025/26
- Reserves League
  - 1981/82
- Reserves League Cup
  - 1981/82
