= Ravenhill Young Men F.C. =

Ravenhill Young Men
- Full name: Ravenhill Young Men Football Club
- Nickname: Ravens
- Founded: 1977
- Ground: Billy Neill Centre, Dundonald
- Chairman: Sammy Morrison
- League: Northern Amateur Football League

Ravenhill Young Men Football Club, referred to as Ravenhill Young Men, or simply Ravenhill, is a Northern Irish, intermediate football club playing in the Northern Amateur Football League. The club is based in Ravenhill, East Belfast, and was formed in 1977. The club, which forms part of the County Antrim & District FA, plays in the Irish Cup.

Ravenhill Young Men played in the Down Area Winter Football League before joining the Northern Amateur Football League for the 2015/16 season. They then relocated to the Billy Neill Centre in Dundonald to play their home games. They previously played their home games at Bradley Pitch in the Lower Ormeau area.

== Colours and badge ==
The Ravenhill Young Men play in red, black and grey stripes. The badge features a raven, which is associated with the Ravenhill area, as ravens historically lived in this area.

== Honours ==
Down Area Winter Football League

- Mervyn Bassett Cup
  - 2008/09
  - 2014/15
