= Glenavy F.C. =

Glenavy
- Full name: Glenavy Football Club
- Founded: 1910
- Ground: Aghalee Playing Fields
- Chairman: Wesley Hanna
- League: Mid-Ulster Football League

Glenavy Football Club, also known simply as Glenavy, is an intermediate-level football club playing in Division 2 of the Mid-Ulster Football League in Northern Ireland.The club is based in Glenavy, County Antrim, and operates a senior team alongside a reserve team, Glenavy Reserves, which compete in the reserve divisions.

Glenavy F.C. is a member of the Mid-Ulster Football Association, and the club's squads compete across regional knockout competitions, including the Mid-Ulster League Cup and Marshall Cup. They also play in the Irish Cup and IFA Junior Cup.

== History ==
The club started play competitive football in 1910, prior to this was friendly organized football matches and training sessions that took place.

In 1927, Glenavy play in the Churches League. They moved on to the Lisburn & District Football League. They won Division 3 and 2 in consecutive seasons, and also won the McCusker cup.

After success in the Lisburn League, Glenavy joined the Mid-Ulster Football League in 2004.

In 2012, Glenavy won the Gerald Kennedy Memorial Cup for the first time in their history.

In 2025, Glenavy won the Beckett Cup, beating Riverdale 4–2 at Hagan Park.

== Club identity and home ground ==
Glenavy F.C. play their home games in black and white. The away kit is blue and yellow.

They play their home games at Aghalee Playing Fields.

Glenavy Academy is the name of the club's youth set-up. Teams are fielded in the South Belfast Youth League.

The club adopted Australian Rock Band Men at Work's hit song "Land Down Under", which is played before kick-off. The club's end of season awards is called the land down under fiasco.

== Honours ==
Mid-Ulster Football League

- Division 3
  - 2011/12 2024/25
- Reserve 2
  - 2013/14
- Beckett Cup
  - 2024/2025

Mid-Ulster Football Association

- Gerald Kennedy Memorial Cup
  - 2012

Lisburn & District League

- Division 3
- Division 2
- McCusker cup
