= Cregagh Wanderers F.C. =

Cregagh Wanderers
- Full name: Cregagh Wanderers Football Club
- Nickname: The Wanderers
- Founded: 2006
- Ground: Cregagh Green / George Best Playing Field
- League: Northern Amateur Football League

Cregagh Wanderers Football Club, or referred to simply as Cregagh, or The Wanderers, are a Northern Irish football club based in Cregagh, East Belfast. Cregagh Wanderers F.C. were founded in 2006, and they play in the Northern Amateur Football League. Cregagh are a part of the County Antrim & District FA. The club play in the Irish Cup.

Cregagh Wanderers took the place of Cregagh Boys Club in the Cregagh area, and play at the same ground, Cregagh Green.

Cregagh Wanderers joined the Northern Amateur Football League for the 2022/23 season following local success. The Cregagh youth teams still play in the South Belfast Football League. In April 2025, Cregagh beat Clonduff in the Cochrane Corry Cup Final.

== Cregagh Boys Club legacy and ground ==
Cregagh Wanderers play their home games at Cregagh Green, also known as George Best Playing Field, the home of the former Cregagh Boys Club. Wanderers play in orange and blue.

Cregagh Boys Club was the youth team within the Cregagh area, the first club that George Best played for. Wanderers have continued the legacy, playing on the same pitches as the defunct club. A mural of Best overlooks the pitch.

In August 2017, a project was launched to protest Gregagh Green from repurposed. It was the first in the UK to receive funding from the Active Spaces Forever programme. The organisers were awarded £5,000 by the London Marathon Charitable Trust to promote physical activity and community participation.

In March 2025, Cregagh Wanderers honored George Best through its new kit. The Wanderers would wear jerseys featuring an image of the late footballer. The image of George on the Wanderers’ jersey is the famous Banksy painting of him "scratching his nether regions". The kit also pays homage to other local icons, including the Titanic and the Harland & Wolff shipyard.

In July 2025, Andrew Bowen, a George Best super-fan, presented trophies and awards to the Cregagh Wanderers end-of-year awards night.

== Honours ==
- Northern Amateur Football League
  - Division 2C
    - 2024-25
  - Cochrane Corry Cup
    - 2024-25
  - Fleming Cup
    - 2024-25
