= Richhill F.C. =

Association football club in Northern Ireland

Richhill
- Full name: Richhill Football Club
- Founded: 1945(merged with Broomhill F.C. 2016)
- Ground: Richhill Recreation Centre

Richhill Football Club was an intermediate-level football club, which last played in the Intermediate B division of the Mid-Ulster Football League in Northern Ireland. The club was based in Richhill, County Armagh. In 2016, it merged with Broomhill F.C. to become Richhill A.F.C.

== Honours ==
=== Intermediate honours ===
- Mid-Ulster Football League: 1
  - 2004–05
