= Kilroot Recreation F.C. =

Association football club in Northern Ireland

Kilroot Rec.
- Full name: Kilroot Recreation Football Club
- Nickname: "rec"
- Founded: 1962
- Dissolved: 2015
- Ground: Castleview Road Playing Fields
- League: Northern Amateur Football League

Kilroot Recreation Football Club, more commonly known as Kilroot Rec., was a Northern Irish football club based in Whitehead, County Antrim. They played in Division 1C of the Northern Amateur Football League. The club was founded in 1962 and was a member of the Amateur League since 1982. Kilroot were dissolved in April 2015. Club colours were red and black.

The club participated in the Irish Cup.
