= Fivemiletown United F.C. =

Association football club in Northern Ireland

Fivemiletown United
- Full name: Fivemiletown United Football Club
- Nickname: The Town
- Founded: 1888
- Ground: Valley Stadium (1993–present)
- Chairman: Davy McQuigg, BEM
- Manager: Andrew Sproule
- League: Mid-Ulster Football League Intermediate A
- 2025/26: Mid-Ulster Football League Intermediate A, 9th
Home colours

Fivemiletown United Football Club, referred to as Fivemiletown United, is an intermediate-level football club who play in the Intermediate A division of the Mid-Ulster Football League in Northern Ireland. The club is based in Fivemiletown, County Tyrone. They are a part of the Mid-Ulster Football Association. Their home ground has been the Valley Stadium on the Cooneen Road in the Town since 1993. The club was formed in 1888, making Fivemiletown United the oldest club in Northern Ireland not playing at Senior Level in the country.

== History ==
The club's most successful period came under stalwart Davy McQuigg as underdogs in the Intermediate B division; they defeated Intermediate A Champions Annagh United in the Premier Cup Final. Annagh went on to play in the Senior Divisions after this season and have not returned to Intermediate football since.

In 2005, McQuigg's side beat a future Premiership club Warrenpoint Town in the same final. His side won the Intermediate B at the first attempt in 2002/03. Andy Parkinson became the second manager to win a trophy at Intermediate Level winning the Marshall Cup in 2010/11. Parkinson departed the club in May 2011 to join Ballinamallard United’s backroom team. The club reached the Premier Cup Final in 2009, 2011 and 2014, losing the former matches against Dollingstown and the latter against Newry City AFC. Scott Robinson brought short-term success during his tenure as manager in 2016/17, leading the club to their most famous moment in December 2016 when they defeated Premier Intermediate League side Dundela F.C. in the 4th Round of the Irish Cup 4–3. This was the first time the club had ever reached the fifth round. However, at the end of the season after a disappointing league campaign several players left for pastures new and Robinson followed, leaving the Town to rebuild again.

Fivemiletown United then appointed former manager Raymond Clarke as manager, with former goalkeeper David Ballantine joining as First Team Coach. After three years under Clarke, during which the club stabilised their position in the MUFL Intermediate A, Clarke was replaced at the end of the 2020/21 season by Chris McDowell and Barry Anderson in a joint managerial partnership. McDowell, a firm fan favourite, holds the illustrious honour of having made the most appearances of all time for the club. Anderson had previously featured as a player and, as a youth coach, guiding the U19s to successive cup final wins in 2018 and 2019. On 24 June 2022, Fivemiletown ended an eleven-year wait for a trophy when they defeated Oxford Sunnyside 2–0 in the Marshall Cup final in Armagh. The trophy had been won eleven years earlier against Hill Street, another Lurgan-based side. In July 2024, Barry Anderson's move to Ballinamallard United as assistant manager paved the way for Scott Robinson to return as first team manager, with Chris McDowell taking on the role of his assistant. After a successful first season back at the Club for Robinson, finishing 3rd in the League. Chris McDowell departed the club for Dergview. In 2025/26 the club finished 9th in the Mid Ulster Intermediate A with Manager Scott Robinson bringing down the curtain on his second spell in charge. At the beginning of 2026/27 season Sean Mallon took charge of the club. Mallon would only last four league games before resigning after a poor start. He was replaced by former Dergview boss Andrew Sproule in September 2026.

== Former players ==
Notable former players with the club have included:

- Roy Carroll – Carroll started his career with Fivemiletown United. The ex-Manchester United keeper is likely the club's most famous ex-player, having won the FA Cup and Premier League with the Red Devils. His brother Ricki is a striker in the club's firsts team. Carroll is now the goalkeeping coach for the Northern Ireland National Team.
- Dermott McCaffery - The ex Hibernian and Falkirk Defender began his career with Fivemiletown United before moving on to Dunbreen Rovers. He is the currently overseeing youth operations at Armagh City.
- Alvin Rouse - The club announced the signing of former Macclesfield Town goalkeeper and Barbados national team keeper on 14 June 2019. He retired in May 2021.
- Lee Bradbury - The former Manchester City and Portsmouth striker played briefly for Fivemiletown during the 1990s when stationed in Northern Ireland with the British Army.
- Simon Yeo - Yeo, a former Lincoln City striker, played briefly for Fivemiletown during the 1990s when stationed in Northern Ireland with the British Army. He appeared in the 1995 Mulhern Cup final which they lost to Enniskillen Rangers.

== Honours ==
Intermediate Honours

- Mid Ulster Intermediate B Division Champions: 2002–03
- Premier Cup: 2001–02, 2005–06
- Marshall Cup: 2010–11 & 2021–22

Junior Honours

- Division 1 Mercer League Champions: 1950–51, 1951–52
- Division 3 Brendan Keogh Cup Champions: 2024-25
- Mulhern Cup: 1933, 1941 (both as Fivemiletown), 1951, 1952, 1953
- Coffey Cup: 1939 (as Fivemiletown Blues), 1948, 1973, 1974, 1977 (as Valley United) 1993, 2005 (as Valley All Stars), 2016
- McCabe Cup: 1949
- Erskine Cup: 1951
- Killyman and District League: 1951
- McCammon Cup: 1962, 1973
- Greystone League: 1960, 1961, 1962, 1963 (all as Fivemiletown), 1972, 1974, 1980
- Fivemiletown Knockout Cup: 1973, 1974, 1975, 1976
- Armstrong Cup: 2014, 2018

Youth Honours

- Fermanagh & Western Youth League (1) – 2016/17
- Lowry Cowry Cup (2) – 2005 & 2008
- Mid Ulster Juvenile League Gilkinson Cup (1) – 2017/18
- Mid Ulster Juvenile League Decor Cup (1) – 2018/19
- Mid Ulster Youth League U17 League Champions (1) – 2024-25
