= Ballysillan Swifts F.C. =

Association football club in Northern Ireland

- Full name: Ballysillan Swifts Football Club
- Founded: 2012
- Ground: Ballysillan Playing Fields
- Manager: Mark Ireland
- Coach: Justin Reid/Daniel Haddock
- League: Northern Amateur Football League/South Belfast Youth League
Home colours	Away colours	Third colours

Ballysillan Swifts Football Club is an amateur football club from Belfast in Northern Ireland.

The First team plays in Division 2C of the Northern Amateur Football League and the Second team plays in Division 3F of the Northern Amateur Football League. Home venue for the teams are Ballysillan 3G & Ballysillan Playing Fields.

The junior teams compete in the South Belfast Youth League and Irish Football Association Small Sided Games.

The club was established in 2012 and initially began life in the Ballymena & Provincial Football League Junior ranks, with the Clubs reserves winning the Division 3 title in 2015. The First team then made the transition to Intermediate football for a season in 2014–2015 before switching to the NAFL. In their time within the NAFL there have been several promotions for both First and Second teams also as trophy wins, with the First team winning the Division 2B title in 2017 and the Second team winning the Division 3E title in 2018. After a couple of barren years stuck in Division 2A, the club made the decision to drop back down to Division 2C to help keep the Club going and to give them a chance to try and rebuild. This was done in 2023 and 2024 has seen the revival of their Second team after playing without one in Season 2023–24.
