= Hanover F.C. =

Association football club in Northern Ireland

Hanover
- Full name: Hanover Football Club
- Founded: 1965
- Ground: Brownstown Park
- Chairman: Andrew Osborne
- Manager: Scott McCordick
- League: Mid-Ulster Football League Intermediate B
Home colours

Hanover Football Club is an intermediate-level football club playing in the Intermediate A division of the Mid-Ulster Football League in Northern Ireland which is the fourth tier in Northern Irish Football. They have been crowned champions of the Mid Ulster Football League three times, most recently in 2019. They play all home games at Brownstown Park in Portadown, County Armagh. Hanover are a member of the Mid-Ulster Football Association

== Honours ==
- Bob Radcliffe Cup: 1
  - 2017–18
- Mid-Ulster Football League: 3
  - 2001–02, 2006–07, 2018–19
- Mid-Ulster Premier Cup: 4
  - 2001-02, 2004–05, 2017–18, 2018–19
