= Lurgan Town F.C. =

Association football club in Northern Ireland

Lurgan Town
- Full name: Lurgan Town Football Club
- Founded: 1988
- Ground: Lurgan Town Arena, Lurgan
- Chairman: Nigel Johnston
- Manager: Lee Dickson
- League: Mid-Ulster Football League Intermediate A

Lurgan Town Football Club, referred to as Lurgan Town, is a Northern Irish football club based in Lurgan, County Armagh. The club plays in the Mid-Ulster Football League. They are a member of the Mid-Ulster Football Association. Its ground is the Lurgan Town Arena.

Lurgan Town have a successful youth team, producing local talent who have gone on to represent more well-known clubs in Northern Ireland.

== History ==
The club was established in 1988. It won Division Two of the Lisburn League in 1996–97, and Division Two of the Mid Ulster League in 2003–04.

The club is one of the biggest in Northern Ireland, fielding no fewer than 18 teams each week in various leagues, from academy level to the senior team.

Before the 2012–13 season, the club's name was Lurgan Town Boys.
