= Tandragee Rovers F.C. =

Association football club in Northern Ireland

Tandragee Rovers
- Full name: Tandragee Rovers Football Club
- Founded: 1909
- Ground: Madden Road
- League: Intermediate A
Home colours	Away colours

Tandragee Rovers Football Club is an intermediate-level amateur football club playing in the Intermediate A division of the Mid-Ulster Football League in Northern Ireland. The club is based in Tandragee, County Armagh. It won a "treble" in the 2000–01 season, winning the Bob Radcliffe Cup, Bass Bowl Trophy and Premier Cup. They are a part of the Mid-Ulster Football Association.

== Honours ==
=== Senior honours ===
- Mid-Ulster Cup: 5
  - 1952–53, 1953–54, 1955–56, 1959–60, 1961–62

=== Intermediate honours ===
- Bob Radcliffe Cup: 1
  - 2000–01
- Mid-Ulster Football League: 4
  - 1961–62, 1968–69, 2010–11, 2014–15
- Premier Cup: 1
  - 2014-15
- Mid-Ulster League Cup: 1
  - 1924–25

== Notable former players ==
- Mick Hoy
