= Crewe United F.C. =

Association football club in Northern Ireland

Crewe United
- Full name: Crewe United Football Club
- Founded: 1961 (as Sparta)
- Ground: Crewe Park; Glenavy, County Antrim
- Chairman: Andrew Rushton
- Manager: Scott Bingham
- League: Mid-Ulster Football League Intermediate A
- 2024/25: Mid-Ulster Football League Intermediate A, 1st
Home colours

Crewe United Football Club is an intermediate-level football club playing in the Intermediate A division of the Mid-Ulster Football League in Northern Ireland. The club hails from Glenavy in County Antrim. The club was formed as Sparta in 1961 and played in the West Belfast League before joining the Northern Amateur League in 1968. In 1971, the club switched to the Lisburn League, and during its time there it change its name to Crewe United, after Crew (or Crewe) Hill southeast of Glenavy. In 1978, Crewe returned to the Amateur League, and gained intermediate status following a Junior Cup win in 1983.

Sparta was later reformed in 1963 becoming Crewe United Football Club, starting out playing in a parks pitch at Woodvale Park in Belfast. Within a short space of time the club acquired its own ground near the village of Glenavy, and a few miles outside the City of Lisburn. Over the years Crewe worked its way up the football structures from junior football and currently play in Northern Ireland's Mid Ulster Intermediate League, the top Division of Intermediate football. They are a member of the Mid-Ulster Football Association.

Crewe have played games in several countries, including the Netherlands, and played Emmen in 1999 in front of 2,699 people. Several English league sides, such as Brentford and Luton Town, have played at Crewe Park. George Best played his last two official games in Northern Ireland for Crewe United, participating in two friendlies, one in 1989 and another in 1995. The match in 1989 took place in Ballyskeagh, their selected opponent was Dundalk for the chosen charity of Action Cancer. Denis Law also attended the friendly in 1989 but opted to watch rather than play. Best later came back in 1995 to play for Crewe United one last time, this time the match took place at Crewe Park against a select eleven called Showbiz Select to raise funds for Down Syndrome charities. His jersey is open for viewing in the club's bar and many photos from the match are located throughout the clubhouse. Currently, Crewe United share their ground, Crewe Park, with Women's NIFL Premiership side, Lisburn Rangers.

== International Training ==
Crewe United has hosted an array of National teams at Crewe Park. In 2022, Crewe United hosted the Italy national under-17 football team as their training grounds while they were in Northern Ireland for match against Northern Ireland U17.

== Honours ==
=== Intermediate honours ===
- Mid Ulster Football League: 1
  - 2024-25
- Marshall Cup: 1
  - 2016–17
- Premier Cup: 1
  - 2024-25

=== Junior honours ===
- Irish Junior Cup: 1
  - 1982–83

=== Reserve Titles ===
- MUFL Reserve League 1: 1
  - 2021-22
- O'Hara Cup(reserves): 2
  - 2022-23, 2024–25
