= Mid-Ulster Football League =

- Founded: 1997
- Country: Northern Ireland
- Divisions: 5
- Number of clubs: 65
- Level on pyramid: 4 and 5 (Intermediate A and Intermediate B only)
- Promotion to: NCL League Two (to be created in 2027)
- Domestic cup(s): Irish Cup; IFA Intermediate Cup; Premier Cup; Marshall Cup
- Current champions: Moneyslane (2025–26)
- Most championships: Dollingstown (5 titles)

The Daily Mirror Mid-Ulster Football League, or simply referred to as the Mid-Ulster League, is an association football league in Northern Ireland. The league is overseen by the Mid-Ulster Football Association. It contains 9 divisions. These comprise two intermediate sections: the Intermediate A and Intermediate B divisions; three junior sections: Division 1, Division 2 and Division 3; and five reserve sections: Reserve Championship, Reserve 1, Reserve 2 and Reserve 3 and Reserve 4. The current champions are Crewe United.

== Format and divisions ==
The league season lasts from August to May with each club playing the others twice, once at their home ground and once at that of their opponents. Teams receive three points for a win and one point for a draw. No points are awarded for a loss. Teams are ranked by total points, then goal difference, and then goals scored.

=== Intermediate A ===
There are 14 clubs, each playing a total of 26 games. The league champions can be promoted to NIFL Premier Intermediate League, providing they meet the admission requirements. Normally the two lowest placed teams are relegated to the Intermediate B division, or lowest three placed teams if the division receives a team relegated from the NIFL Premier Intermediate League and fails to promote a team in return.

=== Intermediate B ===
There are 14 clubs, each playing a total of 26 games. The two highest placed teams are promoted into the Intermediate A division. If the Intermediate A division receives a team relegated from the NIFL Premier Intermediate League and fails to promote a team in return, it will relegate three teams to the Intermediate B division, requiring the team finishing bottom of the Intermediate B division to be relegated to Junior Division 1.

=== Junior divisions ===
There are three divisions which have junior status: Division 1, Division 2 and Division 3. The league winner can be promoted into the Intermediate section as long as their ground meets Intermediate standards.

=== Reserve divisions ===
There are five divisions for reserve sides. The divisions are called Reserve Championship, Reserve 1, Reserve 2, Reserve 3 and Reserve 4.

=== U21 Division ===
The under-21's division is a league for the club's under-21's youth sides to compete in.

== Clubs in membership (2026–27) ==
Intermediate A

- Banbridge Rangers
- Bourneview Mill
- Crewe United
- F.C. Mindwell
- Fivemiletown United
- Laurelvale
- Lower Maze
- Lurgan Town
- Moneyslane
- Newmills
- Richhill AFC
- Tandragee Rovers
- Valley Rangers
- Windmill Stars

Intermediate B

- AFC Craigavon
- Ambassadors
- Bessbrook United
- Craigavon City
- Dromore Amateurs
- Hanover
- Lurgan Celtic
- Markethill Swifts
- Portadown BBOB
- PSNI
- Seagoe
- Seapatrick
- St Marys
- Tullyvallen

Division 1

- Ballyvea
- Caledon Rovers
- Dunnaman
- Glenavy
- Hill Street
- Hillsborough Boys
- Keady Celtic
- Rectory Rangers
- Sandy Hill
- West End Hibs

Division 2

- Annalong
- Armagh Celtic
- Cookstown Olympic
- Donaghmore
- Gilford Crusaders
- Goodyear
- Lisburn Rovers
- Lurgan BBOB
- Red Star
- Riverdale
- Scarva Rangers

Division 3

- AFC Dungannon
- Armagh Blues
- Ballyoran
- Ballynahinch Rangers
- Broomhedge Maghaberry
- Castlecaulfield
- CGR FC
- Donacloney
- Dungannon Rovers
- Epworth
- Loughshore United
- Magheralin Village
- Moira Albion

== List of champions ==
- 1997–98 Lurgan Celtic
- 1998–99 Bessbrook United
- 1999–00 Bessbrook United
- 2000–01 Warrenpoint Town
- 2001–02 Hanover
- 2002–03 Laurelvale
- 2003–04 Ballymacash Rangers
- 2004–05 Richhill
- 2005–06 Laurelvale
- 2006–07 Hanover
- 2007–08 Warrenpoint Town
- 2008–09 Dollingstown
- 2009–10 Warrenpoint Town
- 2010–11 Tandragee Rovers
- 2011–12 Camlough Rovers
- 2012–13 Dollingstown
- 2013–14 Dollingstown
- 2014–15 Tandragee Rovers
- 2015–16 Newry City AFC
- 2016–17 Dollingstown
- 2017–18 Dollingstown
- 2018–19 Hanover
- 2019–20 Banbridge Rangers†
- 2021–22 Ballymacash Rangers
- 2022–23 Oxford Sunnyside
- 2023–24 Oxford Sunnyside
- 2024–25 Crewe United

†Banbridge Rangers were awarded the title on a points per game basis after the league was cut short due to the COVID-19 pandemic.

=== Performance by club ===
Team	No. of wins	Winning years
Dollingstown	5	2008–09, 2012–13, 2013–14, 2016–17, 2017–18
Hanover	3	2001–02, 2006–07, 2018–19
Warrenpoint Town	3	2000–01, 2007–08, 2009–10
Ballymacash Rangers	2	2003–04, 2021–22
Bessbrook United	2	1998–99, 1999–00
Laurelvale	2	2002–03, 2015–16
Tandragee Rovers	2	2010–11, 2014–15
Oxford Sunnyside	2	2022–23, 2023–24
Banbridge Rangers	1	2019–20
Camlough Rovers	1	2011–12
Lurgan Celtic	1	1997–98
Newry City	1	2015–16
Richhill	1	2004–05
Crewe United	1	2024–25
