= Northern Ireland football league system =

Football league system

The Northern Ireland football league system is categorised into three levels: senior, intermediate and junior. Clubs attain intermediate status by fulfilling certain criteria (e.g. owning or leasing its own enclosed ground). Senior status requires clubs to reach stricter criteria. National leagues exist at senior and intermediate level. All junior leagues and some intermediate are organised on a regional basis.

Regionally, there are four regional football associations: the North East Ulster Football Association (also known as the County Antrim & District Football Association), the Mid-Ulster Football Association, the North West of Ireland Football Association and the Fermanagh & Western Football Association.

== Senior ==
The Northern Ireland Football League, which is the national league of Northern Ireland, has two senior divisions, the NIFL Premiership and the NIFL Championship, which consists of twenty-four semi-professional clubs. Members of the Premiership must possess a domestic licence in order to retain membership and members of the Championship must possess a championship licence. Clubs that wish to be promoted to the Championship from intermediate football must attain a Championship Licence.

At national level there are two senior cup competitions: the Irish Cup and the Northern Ireland Football League Cup, although intermediate teams are entitled to enter both.

At regional level, three of the four regional FAs organise their own senior cup competition. The North East Ulster Football Association runs the County Antrim Shield; the Mid-Ulster Football Association organises the Mid-Ulster Cup and the North West of Ireland Football Association organises the North West Senior Cup.

== Intermediate ==
As of 2026, the national league system has one intermediate division: the National Conference League Premier. In order to participate in the Intermediate League, clubs must meet certain criteria, including the standard of the club's ground. At the end of the 2026–27 season, one or two (depending on a play-off) clubs will be promoted from the NCL Premier to the Championship at the end of each season, and one or two clubs will be relegated to the NCL Premier from the Championship, taking their place. In the event, however, that either of the NCL Premier teams does not possess a Championship license, they are not promoted. One club will be relegated from the NCL Premier to the newly formed NCL League One.

The NIFL Premiership Development League, which is also an intermediate league, comprises the reserve teams of the twelve senior NIFL Premiership clubs.

In 2010-11, a "pyramid" system was introduced, with the possibility of promotion and relegation between the national league and the four regional intermediate leagues, namely:

- Ballymena & Provincial Football League
- Mid-Ulster Football League
- Northern Amateur Football League
- Northern Ireland Intermediate League (ended in 2023)

Clubs in these leagues may only gain promotion to the NCL Premier if they win their respective league championship and meet the necessary criteria.

At national level there is one intermediate cup competition: the Intermediate Cup. At regional level, three of the four regional FAs organise their own cup competitions. The North East Ulster Football Association runs the Steel & Sons Cup; the Mid-Ulster Football Association organises the Bob Radcliffe Cup; and the North West of Ireland Football Association organises the Craig Memorial Cup. The Fermanagh & Western Football Association organised the Fermanagh & Western Intermediate Cup for three seasons, but it is now defunct.

In 2023 the Northern Ireland Intermediate League announced that it would cease to exist due to a number of clubs deciding to join other regional leagues within the league system, thus leaving three regional leagues below the Premier Intermediate League.

Until 2026, the third tier was called the NIFL Premier Intermediate League operated by the Northern Ireland Football League (NIFL). Starting from 2026, a new three-tier league system, National Conference League operated by the Northern Amateur Football League, is being launched below the NIFL Premiership and Championship. The names for the third, fourth and fifth divisions will be NCL Premier, NCL League One, and NCL League Two respectively. The NCL Premier was created in 2026, replacing the NIFL Premier Intermediate League, with League One and League Two set to be formed in 2027.

== Junior ==
There are numerous junior leagues in Northern Ireland, including junior divisions of the Northern Amateur League and the Mid-Ulster League. The term "junior" is not related to the age of the players but the fact that the clubs are at amateur level.

There is one national junior cup competition: the Irish Junior Cup. At regional level, each of the four regional FAs organises its own cup competition. The North East Ulster Football Association runs the County Antrim Junior Shield; the Mid-Ulster Football Association organises the Mid-Ulster Shield, the North West of Ireland Football Association organises the North-West Junior Cup, and the Fermanagh & Western Football Association organises the Mulhern Cup.

== The current pyramid system ==
Colour-coding key
Senior (levels 1–2)
Intermediate (levels 3–7)

For each division, its official name and number of clubs is given:

| Level | Total clubs (140) | League(s)/Division(s) | | |
| 1 | 12 | NIFL Premiership; 12 clubs – 1 or 2 relegations | | |
| 2 | 16 | NIFL Championship; 16 clubs – 1 or 2 promotions, 1 or 2 relegations | | |
| 3 | 12 | NCL Premier; 12 clubs – 1 or 2 promotions, 1 relegation | | |
| 4 | 37 | Northern Amateur Football League Premier Division; 14 clubs – 0 or 1 promotion(s), 2 relegations | Ballymena & Provincial Football League Intermediate Division 1; 9 clubs – 0 or 1 promotion(s), 2 relegations | Mid-Ulster Football League Intermediate A 14 clubs – 0 or 1 promotion(s), 2 relegations |
| 5 | 36 | Division 1A; 14 clubs – 2 promotions, 2 relegations | Intermediate Division 2; 8 clubs – 2 promotions, 0 or 1 relegation(s) | Intermediate B 14 clubs – 2 promotions, 0 or 1 relegation(s) |
| 6 | 14 | Division 1B; 14 clubs – 2 promotions, 2 relegations | | |
| 7 | 13 | Division 1C; 13 clubs – 2 promotions, 0 or 1 relegation(s) | | |

== Previous systems ==
At national level, from 1890 until 1915 there was only one league the Irish Football League, which operated at senior level.

In 1915, the Irish Intermediate League was created at intermediate level.

In 1951, the B Division was also created at intermediate level. By 1954, the Irish Intermediate League had become defunct as many clubs left to join the B Division.

In 1977, the B Division split into Section 1 and Section 2.

In 1995, the Irish Football League split into two senior divisions: the Premier Division and the First Division.

In 1999, the B Division Section 1 was renamed the Second Division and Section 2 was renamed the Reserve League.

In 2003, the Irish Premier League was created as the single senior league in Northern Ireland. The Irish Football League First Division reverted to intermediate status alongside the Second Division.

In 2004, the IFA Intermediate League (First and Second Divisions) replaced the Irish Football League.

In 2008, the IFA Premiership replaced the Irish Premier League, and the IFA Championship and IFA Interim Intermediate League replaced the IFA Intermediate League.

In 2009, the IFA Championship was expanded and divided into two divisions and the IFA Interim Intermediate League folded.

In 2010, a pyramid system was introduced, with the possibility of promotion and relegation between the Championship and the four regional intermediate leagues.

In 2013, the Northern Ireland Football League (NIFL) took control of the senior league and the two intermediate divisions below, as well as the Reserve League.

In 2016, Championship 1 acquired senior status and was renamed the 'Championship'; Championship 2 was renamed the 'Premier Intermediate League'; the Reserve League became the Development League.

=== National league system since 1890 ===
| Years | Senior | Intermediate | Reserves^{†} |
|---|---|---|---|
| 1890–1915 | Irish Football League | none | |
| 1915–1954 | Irish Football League | Irish Intermediate League | |
| 1951–1977 | Irish Football League | Irish Football League B Division | |
| 1977–1995 | Irish Football League | Irish Football League B Division Section 1 | Irish Football League B Division Section 2 |
| 1995–1999 | Irish Football League Premier Division; Irish Football League First Division | Irish Football League B Division Section 1 | Irish Football League B Division Section 2 |
| 1999–2003 | Irish Football League Premier Division; Irish Football League First Division | Irish Football League Second Division | Irish Football League Reserve League |
| 2003–2004 | Irish Premier League | Irish Football League First Division; Irish Football League Second Division | IFA Reserve League |
| 2004–2008 | Irish Premier League | IFA Intermediate League First Division; IFA Intermediate League Second Division | IFA Reserve League |
| 2008–2009 | IFA Premiership | IFA Championship; IFA Interim Intermediate League | IFA Reserve League |
| 2009–2013 | IFA Premiership | IFA Championship 1 IFA Championship 2 | IFA Reserve League |
| 2013–2016 | NIFL Premiership | NIFL Championship 1 NIFL Championship 2 | NIFL Reserve League |
| 2016–2026 | NIFL Premiership; NIFL Championship | NIFL Premier Intermediate League | NIFL Premiership Development League |
| 2026–present | NIFL Premiership; NIFL Championship | NCL Premier | NIFL Premiership Development League |

† Senior clubs' reserve teams have intermediate status and compete against other intermediate teams in many competitions.

== Women's system ==
The women's system currently has eight levels. The top tier, the Women's Premiership, is operated by the Northern Ireland Football League while the rest of them are under the NIWFA.

For each division, its official name and number of clubs is given:

| Level | Total clubs (63) | League(s) / Division(s) |
|---|---|---|
| 1 | 8 | NIFL Women's Premiership; 8 clubs |
| 2 | 10 | NIWFA Championship; 10 clubs – 2 relegations |
| 3 | 7 | NIWFA Division 1 League; 7 clubs – 2 promotions, 2 relegations |
| 4 | 8 | NIWFA Division 2 League; 8 clubs – 2 promotions, 2 relegations |
| 5 | 8 | NIWFA Division 3 League; 8 clubs – 2 promotions, 2 relegations |
| 6 | 7 | NIWFA Division 4 League; 7 clubs – 2 promotions, 2 relegations |
| 7 | 8 | NIWFA Division 5 League; 8 clubs – 2 promotions, 2 relegations |
| 8 | 7 | NIWFA Division 6 League; 7 clubs – 2 promotions |
