= Mid-Ulster F.A. =

Football association in Northern Ireland

The Mid-Ulster Football Association, abbreviated to MUFA, commonly referred to as the Mid-Ulster F.A., is one of the four regional football associations affiliated with the Irish Football Association (IFA) in Northern Ireland. The other three associations covering the region are the County Antrim & District FA, the North-West IFA, and the Fermanagh & Western FA.

The Mid-Ulster Football Association oversees the Mid-Ulster Football League and it's divisions from intermediate down to the Mid-Ulster Youth Leagues. This also includes organizing it's cup competitions, such as the Mid-Ulster Cup, Ladies Mid-Ulster Cup and Bob Radcliffe Cup. The Mid-Ulster F.A. also oversees all of the football clubs affiliated with the association.

== History ==
The Mid-Ulster Football Association was established on 2 April 1887. This seen the inauguration of division 1, and the longest-running Mid-Ulster cup competition, the Mid-Ulster Cup. The inaugural winners was Milford F.C.. The founding members included historic clubs from the area, most notably Glenavon F.C. and Portadown F.C.

By the mid-1990s, the Irish Football Association began to refine it's pyramid structure. The top divisions of the MUFL (known as Intermediate A and B) needed clear official recognition. In 1997, the Mid-Ulster FA revised it's leagues feeding the national NIFL Championship/Premier structure with a new format.

2018, Elaine Junk won the Irish Football Association People's Award at the Irish FA Grassroots Football Awards. She was the first woman to be elected into the Mid-Ulster FA's committee. She is an advocate for the progression of women's football in Northern Ireland.

In October 2019, former Mid-Ulster F.A. chairman Isaac Gilkinson died. He was known for his contributions to the junior and grassroots football leagues. The Mid-Ulster F.A. put out a statement "Isaac served for many years at the Irish Football Association, as Chairman of the Mid Ulster FA and Mid Ulster Juvenile League."

== Competitions ==
- Mid Ulster Football League (current format founded 1997) - This includes Intermediate A and B, Divisions 1, 2 and 3, reserves leagues and youth leagues.
- Mid-Ulster Cup (founded 1887)
- Mid-Ulster Shield (founded 1909)
- Bob Radcliffe Cup (founded 1978)
- Marshall Cup (founded 1939)
- O'Hara Cup (founded Mid-1960s)
- Mid-Ulster League Cup (founded 2009)
- Premier Cup (founded early 2000s)
- Alan Wilson Cup (founded 2010)
- Foster Cup (founded 1960s)
- Beckett Cup
- Wilmor Johnston Memorial Cup
- Ladies Mid Ulster Cup
- U21 Division Cup
- Mid-Ulster Youth Cup

== Ivan Marshall Merit Award ==
The Ivan Marshall Merit Award is an annual accolade presented by the Mid-Ulster Football Association to recognize individuals who have made an exceptional contribution to football within Mid-Ulster.

The award was established by the MUFA in memory of Ivan Marshall, a prominent personality and long-serving administrator who was highly respected in association's committee.

=== Winners ===
- 2014 - Brian Gordon
- 2015 - John Brown
- 2016 - Eddie Pepper
- 2017 - Alan Gracey
- 2019 - Aidan Murphy & Carol McAree
- 2025 - Noel McClure
