= 2026–27 Irish Cup =

2026–27 Irish football Cup

Tournament details
- Country: Northern Ireland
- Dates: 8 August 2026 - 1 May 2027
- Teams: 126

Tournament statistics
- Matches played: 77
- Goals scored: 333 (4.32 per match)

The 2026–27 Irish Cup (known as the Clearer Water Irish Cup for sponsorship purposes) is the 147th edition of the Irish Cup, the premier knock-out cup competition in Northern Irish football since its inauguration in 1881. Coleraine are the defending champions after defeating Dungannon Swifts in the 2026 final.

== Calendar ==
The dates for the 2026–27 Irish Cup were announced on 1 July 2026.

| Round | Original date | Number of fixtures | Clubs | New Entries | Leagues entering at this round |
|---|---|---|---|---|---|
| First Round | 8 August 2026 | 34 | 126 → 92 | 68 | Regional intermediate clubs |
| Second Round | 12 September 2026 | 32 | 92→ 60 | 32 | 12 NCL Premier clubs 18 regional clubs with a bye |
| Third Round | 24 October 2026 | 16 | 60 → 44 | None | |
| Fourth round | 21 November 2026 | 8 | 44 → 36 | None | |
| Fifth round | 5 December 2026 | 4 | 36 → 32 | None | |
| Sixth round | 8 & 9 January 2027 | 16 | 32 → 16 | 28 | 12 NIFL Premiership clubs 16 NIFL Championship clubs |
| Seventh round | 12 & 13 February 2027 | 8 | 16 → 8 | None | |
| Quarter-finals | 12 & 13 March 2027 | 4 | 8 → 4 | None | |
| Semi-finals | 2 & 3 April 2027 | 2 | 4 → 2 | None | |
| Final | 1 May 2027 | 1 | 2 → 1 | None | |

== First round ==
86 clubs below Tier 3 were entered the first round. The draw was held on 6 July 2026.

68 clubs were drawn into this round with 18 clubs receiving a bye. The following teams received byes to the Second Round: Abbey Villa, Aquinas, Ards Rangers, Banbridge Rangers, Castlewellan Town, Crumlin Star, Derriaghy CC, Donegal Celtic, Drumaness Mills, Dunmurry Recreation, Dunmurry Young Men, Inspired Talents F.C., Lisburn Rangers, Newcastle Town, Newmills F.C., Newtowne, Portavogie Rangers, St Mary's Youth.

Teams in bold advanced to the second round.

| Ballymena & Provincial | Mid-Ulster League | Northern Amateur Football League |
|---|---|---|
| Intermediate Division 1: **Ballymoney United**; Belfast Celtic; **Desertmartin**; **Newbuildings United**; Wakehurst; **Wellington Rec**; Intermediate Division 2: Brantwood; **Chimney Corner**; **Maiden City**; **Heights**; Glebe Rangers; **Killymoon Rangers**; Tobermore United | Intermediate A: **Crewe United**; **F.C. Mindwell**; Fivemiletown United; **Laurelvale**; Lower Maze; Richhill AFC; Seagoe; Tandragee Rovers; Valley Rangers; Windmill Stars; Intermediate B: **AFC Craigavon**; Bessbrook United; **Craigavon City**; Dromore Amateurs; **Hanover**; Markethill Swifts; Portadown BBOB; PSNI; **Seapatrick**; Tullyvallen | Premier Division: **Comber Recreation**; **Dromara Village**; **Holywood**; **Immaculata**; **Islandmagee**; Division 1A: 1st Bangor Old Boys; **Albert Foundry**; Crumlin United; **Finaghy**; **Greenisland**; Larne Technical Old Boys; **Shankill United**; **Sirocco Works**; St Oliver Plunkett; **Mossley**; **Kilmore Recreation**; Willowbank; Division 1B: Bryansburn Rangers; **Ballynahinch Olympic**; Downshire Young Men; **Dundonald**; **Shamrock**; **18th Newtownabbey Old Boys**; Rosemount Rec; **St Mary's (Newtownabbey)**; **St Matthews**; **Killyleagh Youth**; Division 1C: Bangor Amateurs; Bloomfield; Malachians; Orangefield Old Boys; Portaferry Rovers; Saintfield United; Suffolk; Tullycarnet |

| Team 1 | Score | Team 2 |
7 August 2025
| **Heights F.C. (NL)** | 3–0 | Glebe Rangers (NL) |
| Tobermore United | 0–4 | **St Mary's Newtownabbey (NL)** |
8 August 2025
| **Craigavon (NL)** | 7–0 | PSNI (NL) |
| **Ballynahinch Olympic** (NL) | 5–1 | Tullyvallen (NL) |
| Bangor Amateurs (NL) | 0–2 | **Albert Foundry (NL)** |
| Bloomfield (NL) | 1–6 | **Comber Recreation (NL)** |
| Bryansburn Rangers (NL) | 1–3 | **Killymoon Rangers (NL)** |
| **Crewe United** (NL) | 2–2 (5–4 p) | Valley Rangers (NL) |
| Crumlin United (NL) | 1–2 | **Chimney Corner** |
| **Desertmartin (NL)** | 3–1 | Belfast Celtic (NL) |
| **Dromara Village** (NL) | 6–0 | Rosemount Rec (NL) |
| Dromore Amateurs (NL) | 1–4 | **Immaculata (NL)** |
| **Dundonald (NL)** | 2–1 | Downshire Young Men (NL) |
| Fivemiletown United (NL) | 0–5 | **FC Mindwell (NL)** |
| **Killyleagh Youth (NL)** | 6–2 | Seagoe (NL) |
| **Kilmore Recreation (NL)** | 3–0 | 1st Bangor Old Boys (NL) |
| Larne Technical Old Boys | 3–3 (5–6 p) | **Shamrock (NL)** |
| Lower Maze (NL) | 2–3 | **Craigavon City (NL)** |
| **Mossley (NL)** | 3–0 | Markethill Swifts (NL) |
| **Newbuildings United (NL)** | 2–0 | Bessbrook United (NL) |
| Portadown BBOB (NL) | 0–2 | **Ballymoney United (NL)** |
| Richhill (NL) | 0–5 | **St Matthews F.C. (NL)** |
| Saintfield United (NL) | 0–2 | **Hanover (NL)** |
| **Shankill United (NL)** | 3–1 | Brantwood (NL) |
| **Sirocco Works (NL)** | 3–2 | St Oliver Plunkett (NL) |
| Suffolk (NL) | 1–5 | **Islandmagee (NL)** |
| Tandragee Rovers (NL) | 1–3 | **Seapatrick (NL)** |
| Tullycarnet (NL) | 0–5 | **Maiden City (NL)** |
| **Wellington Recreation (NL)** | 3–2 | Willowbank F.C. (NL) |
| Windmill Stars (NL) | 1–2 | **18th Newtownabbey Old Boys (NL)** |
| Malachians (NL) | 2–4 | **Finaghy F.C. (NL)** |
| Portaferry Rovers (NL) | 0–2 | **Holywood (NL)** |
| **Greenisland** | w/o | Wakehurst |
| **Laurelvale** | w/o | Orangefield Old Boys |

== Second round ==
The 34 first round winners, 18 teams given byes, and the 12 NCL Premier clubs entered the second round. The draw was held on 10 August 2026.

| NCL Premier | Ballymena & Provincial | Mid-Ulster League | Northern Amateur Football League |
|---|---|---|---|
| Ballyclare Comrades; Ballymacash Rangers; Banbridge Town; Coagh United; Dergview; Dollingstown; Knockbreda; Lisburn Distillery; Oxford Sunnyside; Portstewart; Rosario YC; St James' Swifts | Intermediate Division 1: Ballymoney United; Desertmartin; Donegal Celtic; Newbuildings United; Newtowne; Wellington Rec; Intermediate Division 2: Chimney Corner; Maiden City; Heights; Inspired Talents F.C.; Killymoon Rangers | Intermediate A: Banbridge Rangers; Crewe United; Laurelvale; Mindwell; Newmills; St Mary's Youth; Intermediate B: AFC Craigavon; Craigavon City; Hanover; Seapatrick | Premier Division: Abbey Villa; Ards Rangers; Comber Recreation; Crumlin Star; Derriaghy CC; Dromara Village; Drumaness Mills; Dunmurry Young Men; Holywood; Immaculata; Islandmagee; Lisburn Rangers; Division 1A: Albert Foundry; Aquinas; Dunmurry Recreation; Finaghy; Greenisland; Shankill United; Sirocco Works; Mossley; Kilmore Recreation; Division 1B: Ballynahinch Olympic; Dundonald; Newcastle Town; Shamrock; 18th Newtownabbey Old Boys; St Mary's (Newtownabbey); St Matthews; Killyleagh Youth; Division 1C: Castlewellan Town; Portavogie Rangers |

| Team 1 | Score | Team 2 |
12 September 2026
| 18th Newtownabbey Old Boys (6) | 1–2 | FC Mindwell (4) |
| Aquinas (5) | 3–2 | Finaghy F.C. (5) |
| Ballyclare Comrades (3) | 3–0 | Heights F.C. (5) |
| Ballymacash Rangers (3) | 8–2 | Newcastle Town (6) |
| Banbridge Rangers (4) | 2–3 | Ballymoney United (4) |
| Banbridge Town (3) | 0–3 | Ards Rangers (4) |
| Castlewellan Town (7) | 1–2 | Lisburn Distillery (3) |
| Comber Recreation (4) | 1–0 | Portavogie Rangers (7) |
| Craigavon City (5) | 1–3 | Mossley (5) |
| Crumlin Star (4) | 3–2 | Dergview (3) |
| Desertmartin (4) | 4–3 | Derriaghy Cricket Club (4) |
| Donegal Celtic (4) | 1–1 (7–8 p) | Newmills F.C. (4) |
| Drumaness Mills (4) | 2–0 | Immaculata (4) |
| Dundonald (6) | 1–3 | Abbey Villa (4) |
| Hanover (5) | 2–1 | Laurelvale (4) |
| Holywood (4) | 3–1 | Chimney Corner (5) |
| Killyleagh Youth (6) | 2–2 (4–3 p) | Newtowne (4) |
| Killymoon Rangers (5) | 1–8 | Islandmagee (4) |
| Kilmore Recreation (5) | 3–0 | Ballynahinch Olympic (6) |
| Knockbreda (3) | 0–2 | Greenisland (5) |
| Lisburn Rangers (4) | 1–6 | Dollingstown (3) |
| Maiden City (5) | 3–1 | St Mary's Youth (4) |
| Newbuildings United (4) | 1–2 | Coagh United (3) |
| Rosario YC (4) | 2–1 | Dunmurry Young Men (4) |
| Seapatrick (5) | 3–1 | Dunmurry Recreation (5) |
| Shamrock (6) | 2–5 | Oxford Sunnyside (3) |
| Shankill United (5) | 1–0 | Crewe United (4) |
| Sirocco Works (5) | 5–0 | Craigavon (5) |
| St James' Swifts (3) | 6–0 | Inspired Talents F.C. (5) |
| St Mary's Newtownabbey (6) | 0–4 | Portstewart (3) |
| St Matthews F.C. (6) | 2–3 | Albert Foundry (5) |
| Wellington Recreation (4) | 6–2 | Dromara Village (4) |

== Third round ==
The third round consisted of the 32 winners of the previous round. The round was scheduled take place on 24 October 2026, but five fixtures were subsequently postponed due to the effects of Storm Boelo.

| NCL Premier | Ballymena & Provincial | Mid-Ulster League | Northern Amateur Football League |
|---|---|---|---|
| Ballyclare Comrades; Ballymacash Rangers; Coagh United; Dollingstown; Lisburn Distillery; Oxford Sunnyside; Portstewart; Rosario YC; St James' Swifts | Intermediate Division 1: Ballymoney United; Desertmartin; Wellington Rec; Intermediate Division 2: Maiden City | Intermediate A: Mindwell; Newmills; Intermediate B: Hanover; Seapatrick | Premier Division: Abbey Villa; Ards Rangers; Comber Recreation; Crumlin Star; Drumaness Mills; Holywood; Islandmagee; Division 1A: Albert Foundry; Aquinas; Greenisland; Shankill United; Sirocco Works; Mossley; Kilmore Recreation; Division 1B: Killyleagh Youth |

| Team 1 | Score | Team 2 |
24 October 2026
| Albert Foundry (5) | 0–3 | Abbey Villa (4) |
| Aquinas (5) | 2–1 | Newmills (4) |
| Ballyclare Comrades (3) | 1–2 | Greenisland (5) |
| Ballymacash Rangers (3) | 6–4 | Islandmagee (4) |
| Comber Recreation (4) | 3–2 | Kilmore Recreation (5) |
| Desertmartin (4) | 4–1 | Holywood (4) |
| Drumaness Mills (4) | 2–5 | Ballymoney United (4) |
| Mindwell (4) | 2–3 | Lisburn Distillery (3) |
| Rosario YC (3) | 0–2 | Oxford Sunnyside (3) |
| Seapatrick (5) | 1–4 | Portstewart (3) |
| Wellington Rec (4) | 5–1 | Hanover (5) |
27 October 2026
| Shankill United (5) | 2–1 | Killyleagh Youth (6) |
31 October 2026
| Ards Rangers (4) | 2–2 (5–4 p) | Crumlin Star (4) |
| Coagh United (3) | 2–1 | Sirocco Works (5) |
| Dollingstown (3) | 1–3 | St James' Swifts (3) |
| Mossley (5) | 1–4 | Maiden City (5) |

== Fourth round ==
The fourth round consisted of the 16 winners of the previous round. The round took place on 21 November 2026.

| NCL Premier | Ballymena & Provincial | Northern Amateur Football League |
|---|---|---|
| Ballymacash Rangers; Coagh United; Lisburn Distillery; Oxford Sunnyside; Portstewart; St James' Swifts | Intermediate Division 1: Ballymoney United; Desertmartin; Wellington Rec; Intermediate Division 2: Maiden City | Premier Division: Abbey Villa; Ards Rangers; Comber Recreation; Division 1A: Aquinas; Greenisland; Shankill United |

| Team 1 | Score | Team 2 |
21 November 2026
| Abbey Villa (4) | 1–3 | Ballymacash Rangers (3) |
| Ards Rangers (4) | 4–3 | Lisburn Distillery (3) |
| Ballymoney United (4) | 2–1 | Desertmartin (4) |
| Greenisland (5) | 2–3 | St James' Swifts (3) |
| Oxford Sunnyside (3) | 4–1 | Maiden City (5) |
| Portstewart (3) | 2–3 | Aquinas (5) |
| Shankill United (5) | 1–0 | Coagh United (3) |
| Wellington Rec (4) | 2–4 | Comber Recreation (4) |

== Fifth round ==
The fifth round will consist of the eight winners of the previous round. The round will take place on 5 December 2026.

| NCL Premier | Ballymena & Provincial | Northern Amateur Football League |
|---|---|---|
| Ballymacash Rangers; Oxford Sunnyside; St James' Swifts | Intermediate Division 1: Ballymoney United | Premier Division: Ards Rangers; Comber Recreation; Division 1A: Aquinas; Shankill United |

== Sixth round ==
The sixth round will consist of the four winners of the previous round, the 12 clubs of the NIFL Premiership, and the 16 clubs of the NIFL Championship. The round will take place on 8 and 9 January 2027.

== Seventh round ==
The seventh round will consist of the 16 winners of the previous round. The round will take place on 12 and 13 February 2027.

== Quarter-finals ==
The eight seventh round winners will compete in the quarter-finals. The round will take place on 12 and 13 March 2027.

== Semi-finals ==
The four quarter-final winners will compete in the semi-finals, to take place on 2 and 3 April 2027.

== Final ==
The final will take place on 1 May 2027.

== Broadcasting ==
BBC NI Sports provides streaming coverage of the Irish Cup starting from the fifth round. The final will be broadcast live on BBC Television.
