= 2025–26 Irish Cup =

2025–26 Irish football Cup

Tournament details
- Country: Northern Ireland
- Dates: 9 August 2025 - 2 May 2026

Final positions
- Champions: Coleraine (7th title)
- Runners-up: Dungannon Swifts

The 2025–26 Irish Cup (known as the Clearer Water Irish Cup for sponsorship purposes) was the 146th edition of the Irish Cup, the premier knock-out cup competition in Northern Irish football since its inauguration in 1881. The winners qualified for the 2026–27 Conference League second qualifying round. Dungannon Swifts were the defending cup holders.

Coleraine won the cup on 2 May 2026 (their seventh Irish Cup win), defeating Dungannon Swifts 3–2 in the final.

== Results ==
=== First round ===
90 clubs in Tier 3 and below entered the first round. The draw was held on 3 July 2025.

The following teams received byes: Coagh United, Craigavon City, Drumaness Mills, Fivemiletown United, Grove United, Hanover, Immaculata, Killymoon Rangers, Kilmore Recreation, Larne Technical Old Boys, Lower Maze, Maiden City, Newbuildings United, Portaferry Rovers, PSNI, Seapatrick, Tullycarnet, Wakehurst, and Woodvale.

Team 1	Score	Team 2
9 August 2025
18th Newtownabbey Old Boys (NL)	2–0	Portavogie Rangers (NL)
1st Bangor Old Boys (NL)	5–1	Dunloy (NL)
Ambassadors (NL)	4–1	Belfast Celtic (NL)
Aquinas (NL)	4–6	Dromara Village (NL)
Ballymoney United (NL)	3–0	Windmill Stars (NL)
Bloomfield (NL)	0–8	Comber Recreation (NL)
Bryansburn Rangers (NL)	4–1	Tobermore United (NL)
Castlewellan Town (NL)	2–1	Bangor Amateurs (NL)
Colin Valley (NL)	2–0	Orangefield Old Boys (NL)
Crumlin Star (NL)	5–0	Mossley (NL)
Dergview (3)	3–2	St Matthew's (NL)
Desertmartin (NL)	3–1	Moneyslane (NL)
Dollingstown (3)	7–0	Rathcoole (NL)
Dromore Amateurs (NL)	2–5	Finaghy F.C. (NL)
Dunmurry Recreation (NL)	1–2	Abbey Villa (NL)
Dunmurry Young Men (NL)	8–6 (a.e.t.)	Inspired Talents F.C. (NL)
FC Mindwell (NL)	1–0	Crewe United (NL)
Greenisland (NL)	0–1	Newry City (3)
Heights F.C. (NL)	6–3 (a.e.t.)	Lurgan Town (NL)
Holywood (NL)	3–1	Banbridge Town (3)
Islandmagee (NL)	2–4	Sirocco Works (NL)
Killyleagh Youth (NL)	1–2 (a.e.t.)	Shamrock (NL)
Lisburn Rangers (NL)	1–0	Derriaghy Cricket Club (NL)
Malachians (NL)	1–2	Glebe Rangers (NL)
Markethill Swifts (NL)	2–5	Donegal Celtic (NL)
Moyola Park (3)	3–0	St Oliver Plunkett (NL)
Newmills F.C. (NL)	5–0	Tandragee Rovers (NL)
Oxford Sunnyside (3)	2–4	Lisburn Distillery (3)
Portadown BBOB (NL)	0–5	Ballymacash Rangers (3)
Portstewart (3)	1–2 (a.e.t.)	Newtowne (NL)
Rathfriland Rangers (3)	4–1	Brantwood (NL)
Rectory Rangers (NL)	0–7	Banbridge Rangers (NL)
Richhill (NL)	1–0	Shankill United (NL)
Rosario Youth Club (NL)	1–2	St James' Swifts (NL)
Rosemount Rec (NL)	0–4	Knockbreda (3)
Saintfield United (NL)	3–5 (a.e.t.)	Seagoe (NL)
St Luke's (NL)	5–0	Downshire Young Men (NL)
St Mary's Newtownabbey (NL)	0–3 (a.e.t.)	Willowbank F.C. (NL)
St Mary's Youth (NL)	3–1 (a.e.t.)	Ballynahinch Olympic (NL)
Strabane Athletic (3)	6–0	Cookstown Youth (NL)
Suffolk (NL)	2–3 (a.e.t.)	Crumlin United (NL)
Valley Rangers (NL)	0–3	Ballyclare Comrades (3)
Wellington Recreation (NL)	8–0	Tullyvallen (NL)
Bessbrook United (NL)	0–2	Ards Rangers (NL)
Albert Foundry (NL)	1–0	Newcastle (NL)

=== Second round ===
The 45 first round winners and 19 teams given byes entered the second round. The draw was held on 11 August 2025.

Team 1	Score	Team 2
12 September 2025
Crumlin Star (NL)	1–2	Holywood (NL)
13 September 2025
1st Bangor Old Boys (NL)	2–6	Dromara Village (NL)
Abbey Villa (NL)	4–0	Coagh United (3)
Ards Rangers (NL)	4–3	Ballymoney United (NL)
Ballymacash Rangers (3)	2–0	18th Newtownabbey Old Boys (NL)
Bryansburn Rangers (NL)	3–0	Immaculata (NL)
Castlewellan Town (NL)	1–3	Maiden City (NL)
Colin Valley (NL)	2–4	Lisburn Rangers (NL)
Comber Recreation (NL)	8–0	PSNI (NL)
Craigavon City (NL)	7–7 (3–4 p)	Lower Maze (NL)
Crumlin United (NL)	4–0	Portaferry Rovers (NL)
Dergview (3)	2–2 (4–2 p)	Ballyclare Comrades (3)
Desertmartin (NL)	3–3 (4–5 p)	Drumaness Mills (NL)
Donegal Celtic (NL)	3–3 (4–3 p) (Note: Donegal Celtic were expelled from the cup for fielding an ineligible player; Willowbank were reinstated.)	Willowbank (NL)
Dunmurry Young Men (NL)	2–5	St James' Swifts (NL)
FC Mindwell (NL)	2–1	Seagoe (NL)
Glebe Rangers (NL)	3–1	Ambassadors (NL)
Hanover (NL)	1–0	Tullycarnet (NL)
Killymoon Rangers (NL)	2–4	Newry City (3)
Kilmore Recreation (NL)	3–2	Newtowne (NL)
Knockbreda (3)	1–0	Wellington Recreation (NL)
Larne Technical Old Boys (NL)	1–4	Wakehurst (NL)
Moyola Park (3)	8–1	St Luke's (NL)
Newbuildings United (NL)	2–1	Banbridge Rangers (NL)
Rathfriland Rangers (3)	1–0	Albert Foundry (NL)
Richhill (NL)	w/o	Grove United (NL)
Seapatrick (NL)	3–0	Heights F.C. (NL)
Shamrock (NL)	3–4	Finaghy F.C. (NL)
Sirocco Works (NL)	1–3	Fivemiletown United (NL)
St Mary's Youth (NL)	0–4	Lisburn Distillery (3)
Strabane Athletic (3)	7–0	Newmills F.C. (NL)
Woodvale (NL)	0–3	Dollingstown (3)

=== Third round ===
The 32 second round winners entered the third round. The draw was held on 15 September 2025.

Team 1	Score	Team 2
25 October 2025
Abbey Villa (NL)	3–4	Strabane Athletic (3)
Ards Rangers (NL)	1–3	Rathfriland Rangers (3)
Comber Recreation (NL)	8–1	Glebe Rangers (NL)
Crumlin United (NL)	0–8	Newry City (3)
Dergview (3)	0–0 (5–4 p)	Bryansburn Rangers (NL)
Dromara Village (NL)	1–4	Lisburn Distillery (3)
Drumaness Mills (NL)	6–4	Fivemiletown United (NL)
Hanover (NL)	1–0	FC Mindwell (NL)
Holywood (NL)	3–5	Finaghy F.C. (NL)
Kilmore Recreation (NL)	0–3	Ballymacash Rangers (3)
Knockbreda (3)	4–3	Dollingstown (3)
Maiden City (NL)	0–3	Willowbank F.C. (NL)
Moyola Park (3)	5–0	Lower Maze (NL)
Newbuildings United (NL)	2–1	Richhill (NL)
Seapatrick (NL)	3–5	Wakehurst (NL)
St James' Swifts (NL)	2–2 (2–4 p)	Lisburn Rangers (NL)

=== Fourth round ===
The 16 third round winners entered the fourth round. The draw was held on 30 October 2025.

Team 1	Score	Team 2
21 November 2025
Newry City (3)	1–2	Drumaness Mills (NL)
22 November 2025
Ballymacash Rangers (3)	4–0	Willowbank (NL)
Comber Recreation (NL)	3–1	Hanover (NL)
Lisburn Distillery (3)	4–2	Finaghy F.C. (NL)
Lisburn Rangers (NL)	4–4 (4–3 p)	Dergview (3)
Newbuildings United (NL)	1–2	Moyola Park (3)
Strabane Athletic (3)	2–1	Rathfriland Rangers (3)
Wakehurst (NL)	2–4	Knockbreda (3)

=== Fifth round ===
The eight fourth round winners, the 12 teams from the 2025–26 NIFL Premiership, and the 12 teams from the 2025–26 NIFL Championship entered the fifth round. The draw was held on 9 December 2025.

Team 1	Score	Team 2
9 January 2026
Coleraine (1)	4–0	Crusaders (1)
10 January 2026
Comber Recreation (NL)	0–3	Ballymacash Rangers (3)
Dungannon Swifts (1)	3–0	Ards (2)
Carrick Rangers (1)	5–1	Queen's University (2)
Limavady United (2)	4–1	Lisburn Rangers (NL)
Armagh City (2)	1–4	Drumaness Mills (NL)
Moyola Park (3)	2–4 (a.e.t.)	Harland & Wolff Welders (2)
Linfield (1)	1–0	Bangor (1)
Cliftonville (1)	3–0	Dundela (2)
13 January 2026
Warrenpoint Town (2)	4–3 (a.e.t.)	Lisburn Distillery (3)
Portadown (1)	4–2	Annagh United (2)
Ballinamallard United (2)	0–3	Institute (2)
Glenavon (1)	4–2 (a.e.t.)	Newington (2)
20 January 2026
Glentoran (1)	4–0	Strabane Athletic (3)
3 February 2026
Ballymena United (1)	1–2	Larne (1)
Loughgall (2)	2–0	Knockbreda (3)

=== Sixth round ===
The sixteen fifth round winners entered the sixth round. The draw was held on 10 January 2026.

Team 1	Score	Team 2
6 February 2026
Limavady United (2)	1–0	Linfield (1)
7 February 2026
Cliftonville (1)	2–1	Glenavon (1)
Portadown (1)	1–2	Dungannon Swifts (1)
Warrenpoint Town (2)	0–2	Larne (1)
Carrick Rangers (1)	1–4 (a.e.t.)	Coleraine (1)
Harland & Wolff Welders (2)	3–0	Ballymacash Rangers (3)
Loughgall (2)	2–1	Institute (2)
17 February 2026
Glentoran (1)	5–0	Drumaness Mills (NL)

=== Quarter-finals ===
The eight sixth round winners entered the quarter-finals. The draw was held on 7 February 2026.

Team 1	Score	Team 2
6 March 2026
Glentoran (1)	1–1 (0–3 p)	Larne (1)
7 March 2026
Dungannon Swifts (1)	3–0	Harland & Wolff Welders (2)
Limavady United (2)	0–2	Coleraine (1)
Loughgall (2)	0–3	Cliftonville (1)

=== Semi-finals ===
The four quarter-final winners entered the semi-finals. The draw was held on 7 March 2026.

Team 1	Score	Team 2
3 April 2026
Cliftonville (1)	1–1 (3–4 p)	Dungannon Swifts (1)
4 April 2026
Coleraine (1)	2–1 (a.e.t.)	Larne (1)

=== Final ===
The final was held between the two semi-final winners.

2 May 2026
14:30 BST

Dungannon Swifts	2–3	Coleraine
Doyle 55'; Mitchell 66'		Shevlin 20', 60'; Cooper 46'

Windsor Park, Belfast
Referee: Steven Gregg
