= 2024–25 Irish Cup =

2024–25 Irish football Cup

Tournament details
- Country: Northern Ireland
- Dates: 10 Aug 2024 – 3 May 2025

Final positions
- Champions: Dungannon Swifts (1st title)
- Runners-up: Cliftonville

The 2024–25 Irish Cup (known as the Clearer Water Irish Cup for sponsorship purposes) was the 145th edition of the Irish Cup, the premier knock-out cup competition in Northern Irish football since its inauguration in 1881. The winners qualified for the 2025–26 Conference League second qualifying round.

Dungannon Swifts won the cup for the first time, defeating holders Cliftonville 4–3 in a penalty shootout after a 1–1 draw in extra time.

== Results ==
=== First round ===
107 clubs in Tier 3 and below entered the first round. The draw was held on 2 July 2024.

The following teams received byes:

- NIFL Premier Intermediate League (3): Banbridge Town and Oxford Sunnyside
- Ballymena & Provincial Football League Intermediate Division (4): Belfast Celtic, Desertmartin, and Donegal Celtic
- Northern Amateur League Premier Division (4): 1st Bangor Old Boys, Ards Rangers, Derriaghy Cricket Club, Dromara Village, Immaculata, Malachians, and Shankill United
- Mid-Ulster Football League Intermediate A (5): Moneyslane and Seagoe
- Mid-Ulster Football League Intermediate B (5): Bourneview Mill
- Northern Amateur League Division 1A (5): Ballynahinch Olympic and St Oliver Plunkett
- Northern Amateur League Division 1B (6): 18th Newtownabbey Old Boys and Mossley
- Northern Amateur League Division 1C (7): Bloomfield and Short Brothers

Team 1	Score	Team 2
10 August 2024
Aquinas (NL)	2–3	Wakehurst (NL)
Banbridge Rangers (NL)	2–0	Valley Rangers (NL)
Bryansburn Rangers (NL)	0–3	Coagh United (3)
Castlewellan Town (NL)	3–0	Tandragee Rovers (NL)
Colin Valley (NL)	1–2	Islandmagee (NL)
Crewe United (NL)	2–0	Finaghy (NL)
Dollingstown (3)	w/o	Laurelvale (NL)
Downshire Young Men (NL)	1–2	Greenisland (NL)
Dromore Amateurs (NL)	0–3	Wellington Recreation (NL)
Drumaness Mills (NL)	0–2	Crumlin United (NL)
Dundonald (NL)	1–2	Newbuildings United (NL)
Dunloy (NL)	3–1	Lisburn Rangers (NL)
Dunmurry Recreation (NL)	0–3	Albert Foundry (NL)
Dunmurry Young Men (NL)	5–0	Seapatrick (NL)
Fivemiletown United (NL)	0–2	Richhill (NL)
Grove United (NL)	w/o	Rosemount Rec (NL)
Hanover (NL)	1–0	Portadown BBOB (NL)
Heights (NL)	7–0	Rectory Rangers (NL)
Killyleagh Youth (NL)	0–4	Abbey Villa (NL)
Killymoon Rangers (NL)	0–2	Lurgan Town (NL)
Kilmore Recreation (NL)	2–0	Newcastle (NL)
Knockbreda (3)	3–2	Craigavon City (NL)
Larne Technical Old Boys (NL)	0–2	Comber Recreation (NL)
Maiden City (NL)	4–0	Woodvale (NL)
Markethill Swifts (NL)	2–3	Brantwood (NL)
Moyola Park (3)	9–0	Lower Maze (NL)
Newtowne (NL)	5–0	Tullyvallen (NL)
Portaferry Rovers (NL)	3–2	St Luke's (NL)
Portavogie Rangers (NL)	2–2 (4–5 p)	Newmills (NL)
Portstewart (3)	w/o	Tullycarnet (NL)
Queen's University (3)	4–3	Ballymoney United (NL)
Rathfriland Rangers (3)	2–1	Strabane Athletic (NL)
Rosario Youth Club (NL)	6–1	Mindwell (NL)
Saintfield United (NL)	3–2	Cookstown Youth (NL)
Shamrock (NL)	6–2	Orangefield Old Boys (NL)
St James' Swifts (NL)	1–0	Lisburn Distillery (3)
St Mary's Youth (NL)	0–9	Ballymacash Rangers (3)
St Matthew's (NL)	0–6	Sirocco Works (NL)
Suffolk (NL)	1–6	Rathcoole (NL)
Tobermore United (3)	0–4	Dergview (3)
Warrenpoint Town (3)	1–2	Windmill Stars (NL)
Willowbank (NL)	10–0	Ballynahinch United (NL)
13 August 2024
Glebe Rangers (NL)	1–2	PSNI (NL)

=== Second round ===
The 43 first round winners and 21 teams given byes entered the second round. The draw was held on 13 August 2024.

Team 1	Score	Team 2
13 September 2024
Rathfriland Rangers (3)	6–0	Windmill Stars (NL)
14 September 2024
18th Newtownabbey Old Boys (NL)	1–2	Desertmartin (NL)
1st Bangor Old Boys (NL)	2–4	Dollingstown (3)
Abbey Villa (NL)	3–0	Newmills (NL)
Ballymacash Rangers (3)	3–0	Rathcoole (NL)
Ballynahinch Olympic (NL)	1–2	Richhill (NL)
Banbridge Town (3)	3–0	PSNI (NL)
Belfast Celtic (NL)	2–1	Saintfield United (NL)
Coagh United (3)	5–0	Bourneview Mill (NL)
Dergview (3)	4–0	Shamrock (NL)
Donegal Celtic (NL)	w/o	Bloomfield (NL)
Dromara Village (NL)	4–1	Crumlin United (NL)
Dunloy (NL)	2–1	Derriaghy Cricket Club (NL)
Dunmurry Young Men (NL)	5–0	Greenisland (NL)
Hanover (NL)	1–5	Newbuildings United (NL)
Islandmagee (NL)	2–2 (4–3 p)	Heights (NL)
Kilmore Recreation (NL)	1–3	Seagoe (NL)
Knockbreda (3)	1–0	Shankill United (NL)
Lurgan Town (NL)	6–3	Short Brothers (NL)
Maiden City (NL)	w/o	Malachians (NL)
Moneyslane (NL)	2–3	Willowbank (NL)
Mossley (NL)	4–0	Rosemount Rec (NL)
Moyola Park (3)	2–1	Immaculata (NL)
Newtowne (NL)	1–2	Queen's University (3)
Oxford Sunnyside (3)	1–0	Crewe United (NL)
Portaferry Rovers (NL)	1–3	Ards Rangers (NL)
Portstewart (3)	5–1	Brantwood (NL)
Rosario Youth Club (NL)	w/o	Castlewellan Town (NL)
Sirocco Works (NL)	1–5	Banbridge Rangers (NL)
St James' Swifts (NL)	2–1	Comber Recreation (NL)
St Oliver Plunkett (NL)	2–2 (2–4 p)	Wakehurst (NL)
Wellington Recreation (NL)	3–3 (4–3 p)	Albert Foundry (NL)

=== Third round ===
The 32 second round winners entered the third round. The draw was held on 16 September 2024.

Team 1	Score	Team 2
26 October 2024
Abbey Villa (NL)	1–2	Ballymacash Rangers (3)
Ards Rangers (NL)	0–3	Queen's University (3)
Banbridge Town (3)	3–0	Coagh United (3)
Belfast Celtic (NL)	2–1	Oxford Sunnyside (3)
Islandmagee (NL)	4–3	Desertmartin (NL)
Knockbreda (3)	5–1	Bloomfield (NL)
Lurgan Town (NL)	2–0	Seagoe (NL)
Maiden City (NL)	1–3	Rosario Youth Club (NL)
Mossley (NL)	1–1 (2–4 p)	St James' Swifts (NL)
Newbuildings United (NL)	2–7	Dollingstown (3)
Portstewart (3)	2–1	Dromara Village (NL)
Rathfriland Rangers (3)	2–0	Dunloy (NL)
Richhill (NL)	1–4	Wellington Recreation (NL)
Wakehurst (NL)	1–2	Banbridge Rangers (NL)
2 November 2024
Dunmurry Young Men (NL)	1–3	Dergview (3)
Willowbank (NL)	4–5	Moyola Park (3)

=== Fourth round ===
The 16 third round winners entered the fourth round. The draw was held on 28 October 2024.

Team 1	Score	Team 2
23 November 2024
Banbridge Rangers (NL)	1–1 (3–2 p)	Queen's University (3)
Lurgan Town (NL)	0–1	Dollingstown (3)
Moyola Park (3)	1–0	St James' Swifts (NL)
Portstewart (3)	0–1	Belfast Celtic (NL)
Rosario Youth Club (NL)	2–4	Rathfriland Rangers (3)
Wellington Recreation (NL)	w/o	Dergview (3)
30 November 2024
Islandmagee (NL)	0–4	Ballymacash Rangers (3)
Knockbreda (3)	3–0	Banbridge Town (3)

=== Fifth round ===
The eight fourth round winners, the 12 teams from the 2024–25 NIFL Premiership, and the 12 teams from the 2024–25 NIFL Championship entered the fifth round. The draw was held on 26 November 2024.

Team 1	Score	Team 2
3 January 2025
Harland & Wolff Welders (2)	2–4	Glentoran (1)
4 January 2025
Annagh United (2)	3–2	Portadown (1)
Ballymacash Rangers (3)	1–2	Ballinamallard United (2)
Ballymena United (1)	1–2	Ards (2)
Bangor (2)	2–1 (a.e.t.)	Newington (2)
Carrick Rangers (1)	4–3	Newry City (2)
Cliftonville (1)	4–0	Banbridge Rangers (NL)
Coleraine (1)	5–0	Armagh City (2)
Crusaders (1)	3–0	Knockbreda (3)
Dungannon Swifts (1)	5–0	Rathfriland Rangers (3)
Limavady United (2)	1–0 (a.e.t.)	Larne (1)
Linfield (1)	4–0	Wellington Recreation (NL)
14 January 2025
Dollingstown (3)	1–0	Ballyclare Comrades (2)
Glenavon (1)	2–0	Dundela (2)
Institute (2)	2–3	Loughgall (1)
Moyola Park (3)	0–0 (7–6 p)	Belfast Celtic (NL)

=== Sixth round ===
The 16 fifth round winners entered the sixth round. The draw was held on 4 January 2025.

Team 1	Score	Team 2
31 January 2025
Glentoran (1)	2–1 (a.e.t.)	Linfield (1)
1 February 2025
Ballinamallard United (2)	0–3	Carrick Rangers (1)
Bangor (2)	3–0	Annagh United (2)
Cliftonville (1)	3–2 (a.e.t.)	Glenavon (1)
Crusaders (1)	1–0	Limavady United (2)
Dollingstown (3)	0–3	Loughgall (1)
Dungannon Swifts (1)	2–1 (a.e.t.)	Coleraine (1)
Moyola Park (3)	1–3	Ards (2)

=== Quarter-finals ===
The eight sixth round winners entered the quarter-finals. The draw was held on 1 February 2025.

Team 1	Score	Team 2
28 February 2025
Bangor (2)	3–1	Glentoran (1)
1 March 2025
Ards (2)	2–0	Loughgall (1)
Carrick Rangers (1)	1–3	Dungannon Swifts (1)
Crusaders (1)	1–2	Cliftonville (1)

=== Semi-finals ===
The four quarter-final winners entered the semi-finals. The draw was held on 1 March 2025.

Team 1	Score	Team 2
28 March 2025
Ards (2)	0–3	Cliftonville (1)
29 March 2025
Bangor (2)	0–2	Dungannon Swifts (1)

=== Final ===
The final was held between the two semi-final winners.

3 May 2025
14:30 BST

Cliftonville	1–1 (a.e.t.)	Dungannon Swifts
Kearney 90+2'	Report	McGovern 23'
Penalties
Kearney (penalty missed); Hale (penalty scored); Addis (penalty scored); Keaney (penalty scored); Conlan (penalty missed)	3–4	(penalty scored) Bigirimana; (penalty scored) Alves; (penalty scored) Glenny; (penalty scored) Bermingham

Windsor Park, Belfast
Attendance: 12,786
Referee: Ian McNabb
