= 2023–24 Irish Cup =

2022–23 Irish football Cup

Tournament details
- Country: Northern Ireland
- Dates: 12 Aug 2023 – 4 May 2024

Final positions
- Champions: Cliftonville (9th title)
- Runners-up: Linfield

The 2023–24 Irish Cup (known as the Clearer Water Irish Cup for sponsorship purposes) was the 144th edition of the Irish Cup, the premier knock-out cup competition in Northern Irish football since its inauguration in 1881. The winners qualified for the 2024–25 Conference League second qualifying round.

Cliftonville won the cup (their ninth Irish Cup win) on 4 May 2024, defeating Linfield 3–1 in the final.

== Results ==
=== First round ===
105 clubs in Tier 3 and below entered the first round. The draw was held on 5 July 2023.

The following teams received byes:

- NIFL Premier Intermediate League (3): Ballymacash Rangers and Tobermore United
- Ballymena & Provincial Football League Intermediate Division (4): Chimney Corner, Donegal Celtic, Glebe Rangers, and Rathcoole
- Mid-Ulster Football League Intermediate A (4): Valley Rangers
- Northern Amateur League Premier Division (4): 1st Bangor Old Boys, Ballynahinch Olympic, Crumlin Star, Derriaghy Cricket Club, Dromara Village, Immaculata, and Rosario Youth Club
- Mid-Ulster Football League Intermediate B (5): Craigavon City, Dromore Amateurs, Lower Maze, and Seapatrick
- Northern Amateur League Division 1A (5): Dunmurry Recreation
- Northern Amateur League Division 1B (6): Mossley
- Northern Amateur League Division 1C (7): Shamrock, Short Brothers, and Wellington Recreation

Team 1	Score	Team 2
12 August 2023
18th Newtownabbey Old Boys (NL)	2–2 (a.e.t.) (5–4 p)	Malachians (NL)
Abbey Villa (NL)	6–0	Bryansburn Rangers (NL)
AFC Craigavon (NL)	0–7	Willowbank (NL)
Albert Foundry (NL)	0–1	Newmills (NL)
Aquinas (NL)	4–0	Tullyvallen (NL)
Ards Rangers (NL)	0–2	Larne Technical Old Boys (NL)
Ballynahinch United (NL)	1–1 (a.e.t.) (2–1 p)	St Luke's (NL)
Ballynure Old Boys (NL)	1–3	Fivemiletown United (NL)
Banbridge Rangers (NL)	4–1	Bourneview Mill (NL)
Banbridge Town (3)	8–1	Cookstown Youth (NL)
Bangor Amateurs (NL)	2–1	Dunloy (NL)
Belfast Celtic (NL)	0–2	Warrenpoint Town (3)
Bloomfield (NL)	0–8	Oxford Sunnyside (NL)
Brantwood (NL)	3–5	Rosemount Rec (NL)
Colin Valley (NL)	1–4	PSNI (3)
Comber Recreation (NL)	3–2	Armagh City (3)
Crewe United (NL)	0–4	Lurgan Town (NL)
Desertmartin (NL)	2–1	Wakehurst (NL)
Dollingstown (3)	5–1 (Note: Dollingstown were expelled from the cup; Lisburn Rangers were reinstated.)	Lisburn Rangers (NL)
Drumaness Mills (NL)	6–1	Saintfield United (NL)
Dunmurry Young Men (NL)	2–3	Queen's University (3)
Greenisland (NL)	8–0	Orangefield Old Boys (NL)
Grove United (NL)	4–0	Tullycarnet (NL)
Holywood (NL)	1–2	Crumlin United (NL)
Killyleagh Youth (NL)	1–2	Hanover (NL)
Kilmore Recreation (NL)	2–0	Seagoe (NL)
Laurelvale (NL)	2–5	Rathfriland Rangers (3)
Limavady United (3)	4–1	Portavogie Rangers (NL)
Markethill Swifts (NL)	1–4 (a.e.t.)	Islandmagee (NL)
Moyola Park (3)	w/o	Newtowne (NL)
Portadown BBOB (NL)	0–3	Moneyslane (NL)
Portaferry Rovers (NL)	2–1	Finaghy (NL)
Rectory Rangers (NL)	1–3	Newbuildings United (NL)
Richhill (NL)	2–2 (a.e.t.) (3–4 p)	St Mary's Youth (NL)
Shankill United (NL)	1–5	Ballymoney United (NL)
St James' Swifts (NL)	2–4	Lisburn Distillery (3)
St Oliver Plunkett (NL)	7–3	Newcastle (NL)
Strabane Athletic (NL)	5–1	Coagh United (3)
Suffolk (NL)	0–8	Portstewart (3)
Windmill Stars (NL)	1–2	Downshire Young Men (NL)
Woodvale (NL)	4–3	St Matthew's (NL)

=== Second round ===
The second round draw was held on 14 August 2023.

Team 1	Score	Team 2
16 September 2023
18th Newtownabbey Old Boys (NL)	0–3	Willowbank (NL)
Abbey Villa (NL)	5–2	Portaferry Rovers (NL)
Aquinas (NL)	3–1	Chimney Corner (NL)
Ballynahinch Olympic (NL)	1–3	Fivemiletown United (NL)
Ballynahinch United (NL)	0–3	Wellington Recreation (NL)
Banbridge Rangers (NL)	2–3	Dunmurry Recreation (NL)
Banbridge Town (3)	0–1	Moyola Park (3)
Comber Recreation (NL)	5–2	Crumlin United (NL)
Donegal Celtic (NL)	0–1	Crumlin Star (NL)
Downshire Young Men (NL)	2–0	Lower Maze (NL)
Dromore Amateurs (NL)	2–7	Newbuildings United (NL)
Greenisland (NL)	1–3	Limavady United (3)
Grove United (NL)	1–3	Portstewart (3)
Immaculata (NL)	4–2	Islandmagee (NL)
Lisburn Distillery (3)	3–1	Newmills (NL)
Lisburn Rangers (NL)	2–1	Rosario Youth Club (NL)
Lurgan Town (NL)	1–3	Derriaghy Cricket Club (NL)
Moneyslane (NL)	1–2	Kilmore Recreation (NL)
Mossley (NL)	2–9	Drumaness Mills (NL)
Oxford Sunnyside (NL)	3–1	Hanover (NL)
Queen's University (3)	8–1	Woodvale (NL)
Rathcoole (NL)	0–1	Ballymoney United (NL)
Rathfriland Rangers (3)	1–1 (a.e.t.) (2–4 p)	Ballymacash Rangers (3)
Rosemount Rec (NL)	2–0	Larne Technical Old Boys (NL)
Seapatrick (NL)	2–1	Bangor Amateurs (NL)
Shamrock (NL)	1–5	PSNI (3)
Short Brothers (NL)	2–7	Dromara Village (NL)
St Mary's Youth (NL)	2–3	Glebe Rangers (NL)
St Oliver Plunkett (NL)	1–2	Warrenpoint Town (3)
Strabane Athletic (NL)	6–0	Craigavon City (NL)
Tobermore United (3)	3–3 (a.e.t.) (5–4 p)	Desertmartin (NL)
Valley Rangers (NL)	1–1 (a.e.t.) (4–2 p)	1st Bangor Old Boys (NL)

=== Third round ===
The third round draw was held on 18 September 2023.

Team 1	Score	Team 2
28 October 2023
Derriaghy Cricket Club (NL)	4–1	Aquinas (NL)
Downshire Young Men (NL)	1–3	Ballymacash Rangers (3)
Immaculata (NL)	0–3	Crumlin Star (NL)
Lisburn Rangers (NL)	4–3	Dunmurry Recreation (NL)
Newbuildings United (NL)	0–5	Limavady United (3)
Portstewart (3)	1–3	Ballymoney United (NL)
Queen's University (3)	4–3	Comber Recreation (NL)
Seapatrick (NL)	0–2	Valley Rangers (NL)
Strabane Athletic (NL)	3–2	Dromara Village (NL)
Tobermore United (3)	4–1	Kilmore Recreation (NL)
Warrenpoint Town (3)	3–0	Abbey Villa (NL)
Wellington Recreation (NL)	1–3	Fivemiletown United (NL)
Willowbank (NL)	1–0	Moyola Park (3)
4 November 2023
Glebe Rangers (NL)	0–2	Oxford Sunnyside (NL)
Rosemount Rec (NL)	4–2	Lisburn Distillery (3)
11 November 2023
Drumaness Mills (NL)	3–2	PSNI (3)

=== Fourth round ===
The fourth round draw was held on 30 October 2023.

Team 1	Score	Team 2
25 November 2023
Ballymacash Rangers (3)	3–1	Drumaness Mills (NL)
Crumlin Star (NL)	2–0	Limavady United (3)
Fivemiletown United (NL)	0–5	Strabane Athletic (NL)
Queen's University (3)	3–2	Derriaghy Cricket Club (NL)
Rosemount Rec (NL)	3–1	Ballymoney United (NL)
Valley Rangers (NL)	0–3	Oxford Sunnyside (NL)
Warrenpoint Town (3)	6–1	Lisburn Rangers (NL)
Willowbank (NL)	3–2	Tobermore United (3)

=== Fifth round ===
The eight fourth round winners were joined by the twelve teams from the 2023–24 NIFL Premiership and the twelve teams from the 2023–24 NIFL Championship in the fifth round. The draw was held on 6 December 2023. Five teams from the fourth tier were the lowest ranked surviving teams in this round.

Team 1	Score	Team 2
5 January 2024
Coleraine (1)	0–3 (a.e.t.)	Cliftonville (1)
6 January 2024
Knockbreda (2)	0–4	Glenavon (1)
Oxford Sunnyside (NL)	2–3 (a.e.t.)	Ballymacash Rangers (3)
Queen's University (3)	0–4	Ballymena United (1)
Ballyclare Comrades (2)	5–2	Strabane Athletic (NL)
Bangor (2)	3–1	Dergview (2)
Carrick Rangers (1)	1–1 (a.e.t.) (4–5 p)	Portadown (2)
Crusaders (1)	1–1 (a.e.t.) (6–7 p)	Ards (2)
Dungannon Swifts (1)	5–0	Willowbank (NL)
Glentoran (1)	1–0	Annagh United (2)
Harland & Wolff Welders (2)	1–4	Larne (1)
Institute (2)	2–0 (a.e.t.)	Crumlin Star (NL)
Linfield (1)	4–2	Warrenpoint Town (3)
Loughgall (1)	3–0	Rosemount Rec (NL)
Newington (2)	2–1	Dundela (2)
Newry City (1)	3–2	Ballinamallard United (2)

=== Sixth round ===
The 16 fifth round winners entered the sixth round. The draw was held on 6 January 2024. Ballymacash Rangers from the Intermediate Division (Tier 3) were the lowest ranked survivor in this round, and the only non-senior team in the last 16.

Team 1	Score	Team 2
2 February 2024
Ballymacash Rangers (3)	1–6	Glentoran (1)
3 February 2024
Cliftonville (1)	4–0	Loughgall (1)
Dungannon Swifts (1)	2–3	Ballyclare Comrades (2)
Institute (2)	1–0	Ards (2)
Larne (1)	5–0	Glenavon (1)
Linfield (1)	2–0	Ballymena United (1)
Newry City (1)	1–2	Newington (2)
Portadown (2)	2–1	Bangor (2)

=== Quarter-finals ===
The eight sixth round winners entered the quarter-finals. The draw was held on 3 February 2024.

Team 1	Score	Team 2
1 March 2024
Portadown (2)	0–2	Cliftonville (1)
2 March 2024
Glentoran (1)	2–0	Ballyclare Comrades (2)
Larne (1)	4–1	Newington (2)
3 March 2024
Institute (2)	1–3	Linfield (1)

=== Semi-finals ===
The four quarter-final winners entered the semi-finals. The draw was held on 2 March 2024.

Team 1	Score	Team 2
29 March 2024
Glentoran (1)	1–3	Linfield (1)
30 March 2024
Cliftonville (1)	2–0	Larne (1)

=== Final ===
The final was held between the two semi-final winners.

4 May 2024
14:30 BST

Cliftonville	3–1 (a.e.t.)	Linfield
Ashford 52'; Hale 91', 120+5'	Report	McGee 14'

Windsor Park, Belfast
Attendance: 14,898
Referee: Jamie Robinson
