= 2021–22 Irish Cup =

2021–22 Irish football Cup

Tournament details
- Country: Northern Ireland
- Dates: 7 Aug 2021 – 7 May 2022
- Teams: 128 (incl. qualifying); 32 (main competition)

Final positions
- Champions: Crusaders (5th win)
- Runners-up: Ballymena United

Tournament statistics
- Matches played: 124
- Goals scored: 484 (3.9 per match)

The 2021–22 Irish Cup (known as the Samuel Gelston's Whiskey Irish Cup for sponsorship purposes) was the 142nd edition of the Irish Cup, the premier knockout cup competition in Northern Irish football since its inauguration in 1881. The competition began on 7 August 2021 and concluded with the final at Windsor Park, Belfast on 7 May 2022.

Linfield were the defending champions, having defeated Larne 2–1 in the previous season's final. This season, they were defeated by Larne in the second round.

Crusaders were the winners, defeating Ballymena United 2–1 in the first ever meeting between the two teams in the final, and qualified for the 2022–23 UEFA Europa Conference League first qualifying round.

== Format and schedule ==
128 clubs entered this season's competition. This was a large increase on the 26 entrants for the previous season's competition, which was played in a condensed format as a result of the COVID-19 pandemic in Northern Ireland. This season, the stages of the cup were renamed. The first four rounds will now be known as qualifying rounds, with what was historically known as the fifth round now becoming the first round of the main competition. 104 clubs entered the draw for the first qualifying round. 80 of them were drawn to face each other in 40 ties, with the remaining 24 given byes into the second qualifying round. After two further knockout rounds, the eight winners from the fourth qualifying round will join the 24 clubs from the NIFL Premiership and NIFL Championship in the first round of the main competition.

Round	Match dates	Fixtures	Clubs
First qualifying round	7 & 14 August 2021	40	128 → 87
Second qualifying round	24 & 25 September 2021	30	87 → 56
Third qualifying round	30 October 2021	16	56 → 40
Fourth qualifying round	27 November 2021	8	40 → 32
First round	7 & 8 January 2022	16	32 → 16
Second round	4, 5 & 15 February 2022	8	16 → 8
Quarter-finals	4 & 5 March 2022	4	8 → 4
Semi-finals	1 & 26 April 2022	2	4 → 2
Final	7 May 2022	1	2 → 1

Tiers	Leagues	No. of Entries	Entry round
1	NIFL Premiership	12	First round
2	NIFL Championship	12	First round
3	NIFL Premier Intermediate League	10	First qualifying round (Second qualifying round if byed)
4	Ballymena & Provincial Football League Premier Division; Mid-Ulster Football League Intermediate A Northern Amateur Football League Premier Division; Northern Ireland Intermediate League	94	First qualifying round (Second qualifying round if byed)
5	Mid-Ulster Football League Intermediate B Northern Amateur Football League Division 1A	94	First qualifying round (Second qualifying round if byed)
6	Northern Amateur Football League Division 1B	94	First qualifying round (Second qualifying round if byed)
7	Northern Amateur Football League Division 1C	94	First qualifying round (Second qualifying round if byed)

== Qualifying rounds ==
The league tier of each club at the time of entering the competition is listed in parentheses.

- (1) = NIFL Premiership
- (2) = NIFL Championship
- (3) = NIFL Premier Intermediate League
- (NL) = Non-league (clubs outside the Northern Ireland Football League – levels 4–7)

=== First qualifying round ===
The draw for the first qualifying round took place on 20 July 2021, with the matches played on 7 and 14 August 2021. 104 clubs from level 3 and below entered the draw for the first qualifying round. 80 of them were randomly drawn to face each other in 40 ties.

The remaining 24 clubs, namely: 18th Newtownabbey Old Boys (NL), Ballynahinch Olympic (NL), Bangor (3), Bloomfield (NL), Colin Valley (NL), Comber Recreation (NL), Crewe United (NL), Downshire Young Men (NL), Drumaness Mills (NL), Dunmurry Young Men (NL), Glebe Rangers (NL), Immaculata (NL), Kilmore Recreation (NL), Laurelvale (NL), Lisburn Rangers (NL), Markethill Swifts (NL), Mossley (NL), Newington (3), Oxford Sunnyside (NL), Rathfriland Rangers (NL), St James' Swifts (NL), St Mary's (NL), Strabane Athletic (NL) and Tandragee Rovers (NL) all received byes into the second qualifying round.

Team 1	Score	Team 2
7 August 2021
Ballynure Old Boys (NL)	4–2	Seagoe (NL)
14 August 2021
1st Bangor Old Boys (NL)	1–4	Lower Maze (NL)
Abbey Villa (NL)	2–1	Shorts (NL)
Ambassadors (NL)	2–5	Ardstraw (NL)
Ards Rangers (NL)	3–0	Bryansburn Rangers (NL)
Ballymoney United (NL)	2–0	Richhill (NL)
Ballynahinch United (NL)	1–2	Greenisland (NL)
Banbridge Rangers (NL)	3–1	Moneyslane (NL)
Bangor Amateurs (NL)	4–1	Clonard (NL)
Belfast Celtic (NL)	1–2	Ballymacash Rangers (NL)
Brantwood (NL)	0–1	Coagh United (NL)
Chimney Corner (NL)	10–2	Rectory Rangers (NL)
Cookstown Royal British Legion (NL)	0–5	Banbridge Town (3)
Cookstown Youth (NL)	1–2	Killyleagh Youth (NL)
Craigavon City (NL)	2–1	Malachians (NL)
Crumlin United (NL)	3–1	Saintfield United (NL)
Derriaghy Cricket Club (NL)	6–2	Albert Foundry (NL)
Desertmartin (NL)	3–0	Orangefield Old Boys (NL)
Dollingstown (3)	3–3 (a.e.t.) (3–2 p)	Crumlin Star (NL)
Dromara Village (NL)	5–3	Dunmurry Recreation (NL)

Team 1	Score	Team 2
Dromore Amateurs (NL)	0–3	Limavady United (3)
Dunloy (NL)	2–1	Tullycarnet (NL)
Grove United (NL)	3–5	Newtowne (NL)
Hanover (NL)	2–1	Bourneview Mill (NL)
Holywood (NL)	3–0	Barn United (NL)
Islandmagee (NL)	4–0	Suffolk (NL)
Larne Tech Old Boys (NL)	1–2	Fivemiletown United (NL)
Lisburn Distillery (3)	3–1	Newcastle (NL)
Lurgan Town (NL)	1–3	PSNI (3)
Rosario Youth (NL)	1–0	Woodvale (NL)
Shankill United (NL)	3–2	Newbuildings United (NL)
Sirocco Works (NL)	6–1	Bangor Swifts (NL)
St Luke's (NL)	0–1	Aquinas (NL)
St Oliver Plunkett (NL)	4–3	Rosemount Recreation (NL)
Tobermore United (3)	2–2 (a.e.t.) (5–3 p)	East Belfast (NL)
Tullyvallen (NL)	0–5	Maiden City (NL)
Valley Rangers (NL)	2–5	Portstewart (3)
Wakehurst (NL)	0–2	Armagh City (3)
Wellington Recreation (NL)	2–1	Donegal Celtic (NL)
Windmill Stars (NL)	1–0	Dungiven Celtic (NL)

=== Second qualifying round ===
64 clubs entered the second qualifying round; the 40 winners from the first qualifying round, along with the 24 clubs that received byes. The matches were played on 24 and 25 September 2021. Mossley, originally drawn to face Wellington Recreation or Donegal Celtic, were given a bye into the third qualifying round after both clubs were dismissed from the competition.

Team 1	Score	Team 2
24 September 2021
Glebe Rangers (NL)	0–3	Colin Valley (NL)
25 September 2021
18th Newtownabbey Old Boys (NL)	3–4	Shankill United (NL)
Aquinas (NL)	1–5	Crewe United (NL)
Ards Rangers (NL)	3–1	Crumlin United (NL)
Armagh City (3)	3–0	Dollingstown (3)
Ballynahinch Olympic (NL)	1–1 (a.e.t.) (5–3 p)	Immaculata (NL)
Banbridge Rangers (NL)	5–0	Desertmartin (NL)
Banbridge Town (3)	2–3 (a.e.t.)	Tobermore United (3)
Bangor (3)	2–1	Killyleagh Youth (NL)
Bangor Amateurs (NL)	2–4	Windmill Stars (NL)
Coagh United (NL)	1–8	Ballymacash Rangers (NL)
Comber Recreation (NL)	1–2	Kilmore Recreation (NL)
Craigavon City (NL)	3–4	Dromara Village (NL)
Derriaghy Cricket Club (NL)	2–0	Bloomfield (NL)
Downshire Young Men (NL)	0–3	Newington (3)
Drumaness Mills (NL)	2–2 (a.e.t.) (4–2 p)	Fivemiletown United (NL)

Team 1	Score	Team 2
Dunloy (NL)	2–1	Markethill Swifts (NL)
Dunmurry Young Men (NL)	1–3	St Mary's (NL)
Greenisland (NL)	1–0	Ardstraw (NL)
Hanover (NL)	0–1	Tandragee Rovers (NL)
Islandmagee (NL)	5–3	Ballynure Old Boys (NL)
Limavady United (3)	3–0 (a.e.t.)	PSNI (3)
Lisburn Distillery (3)	2–1	Ballymoney United (NL)
Lower Maze (NL)	6–2	Laurelvale (NL)
Maiden City (NL)	0–3	Portstewart (3)
Oxford Sunnyside (NL)	3–3 (a.e.t.) (8–7 p)	Chimney Corner (NL)
Rathfriland Rangers (NL)	3–0	Abbey Villa (NL)
Rosario Youth (NL)	3–2	Lisburn Rangers (NL)
Sirocco Works (NL)	w/o	Newtowne (NL)
St Oliver Plunkett (NL)	1–1 (a.e.t.) (3–4 p)	St James' Swifts (NL)
Strabane Athletic (NL)	3–3 (a.e.t.) (0–3 p)	Holywood (NL)

=== Third qualifying round ===
32 clubs entered the third qualifying round; the 30 winners from the second qualifying round matches, along with Sirocco Works who received a walkover after their opponents withdrew, and Mossley who received a bye. The matches were played on 30 October 2021.

Team 1	Score	Team 2
Ards Rangers (NL)	3–2 (a.e.t.)	Banbridge Rangers (NL)
Armagh City (3)	0–1	Windmill Stars (NL)
Ballymacash Rangers (NL)	0–3	Portstewart (3)
Ballynahinch Olympic (NL)	0–2	Newington (3)
Bangor (3)	2–0	St James' Swifts (NL)
Colin Valley (NL)	4–1	Crewe United (NL)
Dromara Village (NL)	2–3	Rathfriland Rangers (NL)
Dunloy (NL)	2–2 (a.e.t.) (3–4 p)	Derriaghy Cricket Club (NL)
Greenisland (NL)	2–1	Lisburn Distillery (3)
Holywood (NL)	3–5	Limavady United (3)
Islandmagee (NL)	1–1 (a.e.t.) (3–0 p)	Drumaness Mills (NL)
Kilmore Recreation (NL)	3–2	Lower Maze (NL)
Mossley (NL)	4–4 (a.e.t.) (3–0 p)	Shankill United (NL)
Oxford Sunnyside (NL)	3–0	Rosario Youth (NL)
Sirocco Works (NL)	2–4	Tobermore United (3)
Tandragee Rovers (NL)	2–1	St Mary's (NL)

=== Fourth qualifying round ===
The 16 third qualifying round winners entered the fourth qualifying round. The matches were played on 27 November 2021. The eight winners from this round qualified for the first round of the main competition.

Team 1	Score	Team 2
Ards Rangers (NL)	2–2 (a.e.t.) (6–5 p)	Greenisland (NL)
Colin Valley (NL)	0–2	Bangor (3)
Kilmore Recreation (NL)	1–1 (a.e.t.) (4–5 p)	Islandmagee (NL)
Limavady United (3)	4–1	Rathfriland Rangers (NL)
Mossley (NL)	1–3	Portstewart (3)
Newington (3)	3–1	Derriaghy Cricket Club (NL)
Oxford Sunnyside (NL)	2–1	Tandragee Rovers (NL)
Windmill Stars (NL)	2–1	Tobermore United (3)

== Main competition ==
=== First round ===
32 clubs entered the first round of the main competition; the 24 clubs from levels 1 and 2 (the NIFL Premiership and NIFL Championship), along with the eight clubs that progressed through the four qualifying rounds. The matches were played on 7 and 8 January 2022.

Team 1	Score	Team 2
7 January 2022
Glenavon (1)	0–4	Crusaders (1)
8 January 2022
Ballinamallard United (2)	2–0 (a.e.t.)	Ards Rangers (NL)
Ballyclare Comrades (2)	0–2	Carrick Rangers (1)
Ballymena United (1)	2–0	Loughgall (2)
Bangor (3)	0–5	Larne (1)
Cliftonville (1)	5–0	Islandmagee (NL)
Coleraine (1)	6–0	Windmill Stars (NL)
Dergview (2)	2–3	Glentoran (1)
Dundela (2)	3–2	Ards (2)
Harland & Wolff Welders (2)	1–2	Annagh United (2)
Institute (2)	0–1	Portstewart (3)
Knockbreda (2)	0–2	Dungannon Swifts (1)
Linfield (1)	4–0	Oxford Sunnyside (NL)
Portadown (1)	2–0	Limavady United (3)
Queen's University (2)	2–0	Newington (3)
Warrenpoint Town (1)	1–2	Newry City (2)

=== Second round ===
The second round draw was made on 8 January 2022. The 16 first round winners entered the second round. The matches are due to be played on 4, 5 and 15 February 2022.

Team 1	Score	Team 2
4 February 2022
Larne (1)	2–0	Linfield (1)
Newry City (2)	1–0	Ards (2)
5 February 2022
Ballinamallard United (2)	0–1	Crusaders (1)
Carrick Rangers (1)	0–1	Cliftonville (1)
Coleraine (1)	2–0	Portadown (1)
Dungannon Swifts (1)	4–1	Annagh United (2)
Queen's University (2)	0–4	Glentoran (1)
15 February 2022
Ballymena United (1)	3–0	Portstewart (3)

=== Quarter-finals ===
The 8 second round winners entered the quarter-finals. The matches were played on 4 and 5 March 2022.

4 March 2022	Cliftonville (1)	2–1	Coleraine (1)	Solitude, Belfast
19:45 GMT	Gormley 56'; McDonagh 65'	BBC Sport	Kane 24'

5 March 2022	Ballymena United (1)	3–3 (a.e.t.) (4–3 p)	Larne (1)	Ballymena Showgrounds, Ballymena
15:00 GMT	McElroy 25' (pen.); Parkhouse 45'; Place 78'	BBC Sport	Lynch 5'; Bonis 14'; Watson 31'

5 March 2022	Crusaders (1)	4–2	Dungannon Swifts (1)	Seaview, Belfast
15:00 GMT	Robinson 31'; Kennedy 57'; Owens 84', 87'	BBC Sport	Knowles 38' (pen.); Campbell 51'

5 March 2022	Glentoran (1)	1 – 0	Newry City (2)	The Oval, Belfast
15:00 GMT	Donnelly 27'	BBC Sport

=== Semi-finals ===
The 4 quarter-final winners entered the semi-finals. The matches were played on 1 and 26 April 2022. Both semi-finals were originally scheduled to take place on 1 April. However, the match between Newry City and Ballymena United was delayed as a result of Glentoran's appeal against their expulsion from the competition.

1 April 2022	Cliftonville (1)	1–2	Crusaders (1)	Windsor Park, Belfast
19:45 BST	Gormley 8'	BBC Sport	McNicholas 35' (o.g.); Burns 45+1'

26 April 2022	Newry City (2)	0–1	Ballymena United (1)	Mourneview Park, Lurgan
19:45 BST		BBC Sport	McCullough 53'

=== Final ===
Ballymena United and Crusaders competed in an Irish Cup final for the first time. Ballymena United were runners-up against Glentoran in 2020, while Crusaders' last appearance in the final was in 2019, winning the cup with a 3–0 win over Ballinamallard United. The final was played on 7 May 2022 at Windsor Park, Belfast.

7 May 2022
15:00 BST

Ballymena United (1)	1–2 (a.e.t.)	Crusaders (1)
Weir 9' (o.g.)	BBC Sport	Robinson 90+3'; McMurray 120+1'

Windsor Park, Belfast
Attendance: 7,598
Referee: Tony Clarke

== Notes ==
1. Wellington Recreation and Donegal Celtic were both later dismissed from the competition for disciplinary reasons, after this match was abandoned.
2. Dundela were expelled from the cup for fielding an ineligible player in this match, with Ards being reinstated to the second round.
3. Glentoran were expelled from the cup for fielding an ineligible player in this match, with Newry City being reinstated to the semi-finals. Glentoran appealed the decision, but the IFA appeals board dismissed the case. The club then decided to take the matter to arbitration, but the arbitrator upheld the IFA's decision to expel Glentoran from the competition.
