= 2004–05 Irish Cup =

Tournament details
- Country: Northern Ireland
- Teams: 107

Final positions
- Champions: Portadown (3rd win)
- Runners-up: Larne

Tournament statistics
- Matches played: 113
- Goals scored: 393 (3.48 per match)

The 2004–05 Irish Cup was the 125th edition of the Irish Cup, Northern Ireland's premier football knock-out cup competition. It concluded on 7 May 2005 with the final.

Glentoran were the defending champions, winning their 20th Irish Cup last season after a 1–0 win over Coleraine in the 2004 final. This season the Glens reached the semi-final stage, but were defeated by Portadown, who then went on to lift the cup for the third time with a 5–1 victory over Larne in the final.

It was the highest scoring final in 36 years, since the 1969 final replay when Ards defeated Distillery 4–2. It was also the first time in 43 years that the final had been won by a four-goal margin, when Linfield defeated Portadown 4–0 in 1962. This was Larne's fifth appearance in the final without ever winning; a record in the competition that still stands. They had previously been runners-up in the 1928, 1935, 1987 and 1989 finals. Derry Celtic (1898 and 1904) and Limavady (1885 and 1886) are the only other clubs to have reached the final more than once, but never won.

== Results ==
=== Preliminary round ===
Team 1	Score	Team 2
Abbey Villa	3–5	Albert Foundry
Annagh United	3–0	Laurelvale
Ballynahinch United	2–1	Roe Valley
Barn United	1–3	Blackers Mill
Bryansburn Rangers	3–6	Rasharkin United
Churchhill Kilfennan United	3–0	Dunmurry Young Men
Dergview	8–0	Broomhedge
Downpatrick	6–2	Dromore Amateurs
Downshire Young Men	3–4	Sirocco Works
Fivemiletown United	3–2	Bangor Amateurs
Glebe Rangers	0–2	Lisburn Rangers
Grove United	1–0	Dundonald
Islandmagee	4–1	Markethill Swifts
Killymoon Rangers	1–2	Donard Hospital
Larne Tech Old Boys	3–2	Newbuildings United
Malachians	11–0	Banbridge AFC
Newington YC	2–3	Holywood
Orangefield Old Boys	3–0	Nortel
Oxford United Stars	4–3	Draperstown Celtic
Portadown BBOB	0–1	Ballymacash Rangers
Rosario YC	3–1	Civil Service
Seagoe	0–1	Magherafelt Sky Blues
Shorts	2–4	Warrenpoit Town
Sperrin Olympic	3–0	Ballycastle United
Strabane	2–0	Hanover
UUC	0–4	Desertmartin
Wellington Recreation	4–1	Tandragee Rovers

=== First round ===
Team 1	Score	Team 2
Albert Foundry	4–0	Rosario YC
Annagh United	1–3	Lisburn Rangers
Dergview	4–0	Grove United
Desertmartin	1–2	Sirocco Works
Donard Hospital	1–2	Churchhill Kilfennan United
Downpatrick	5–0	Blackers Mill
Holywood	1–4	Malachians
Larne Tech Old Boys	5–0	Fivemiletown United
Magherafelt Sky Blues	3–0	Wellington Recreation
Nortel	3–0	Islandmagee
Rasharkin United	4–3	Oxford United Stars
Saintfield United	0–2	Ballymacash Rangers
Strabane	2–1	Sperrin Olympic

=== Second round ===
Team 1	Score	Team 2
Albert Foundry	2–1	Rasharkin United
Ballymacash Rangers	1–4	Ballynahinch United
Dergview	2–0	Larne Tech Old Boys
Downpatrick	1–2	Strabane
Magherafelt Sky Blues	2–0	Churchhill Kilfennan United
Malachians	1–1 (a.e.t.) (4–5 p)	Lisburn Rangers
Nortel	2–3	Sirocco Works

=== Third round ===
Team 1	Score	Team 2
1st Bangor Old Boys	2–4	Dromara Village
Ards Rangers	0–1	Kilmore Recreation
Ballymoney United	1–0	Portstewart
Ballynahinch United	2–1	Strabane
Banbridge Town	4–1	Queen's University
Chimney Corner	0–2	East Belfast
Coagh United	2–1	Albert Foundry
Comber Recreation	2–1	Crewe United
Crumlin United	1–2	Ballinamallard United
Dundela	2–0	Brantwood
Dunmurry Recreation	0–2	Donegal Celtic
Enkalon	1–2	Knockbreda Parish
Harland & Wolff Welders	2–1	Drumaness Mills
Larne Tech Old Boys	2–0	Rathfriland Rangers
Lisburn Rangers	2–0	Killyleagh Youth
Magherafelt Sky Blues	0–1	Moyola Park
PSNI	1–4	Sirocco Works
Wakehurst	3–1	Lurgan Celtic

=== Fourth round ===
Team 1	Score	Team 2
Banbridge Town	2–1	Ballynahinch United
Coagh United	3–0	Sirocco Works
Donegal Celtic	2–0	Wakehurst
Dundela	1–3	Ballinamallard United
Harland & Wolff Welders	3–0	Dromara Village
Knockbreda Parish	2–3	East Belfast
Larne Tech Old Boys	2–4	Ballymoney United
Lisburn Rangers	3–0	Comber Recreation
Moyola Park	0–1	Kilmore Recreation

=== Fifth round ===
Team 1	Score	Team 2
Armagh City	1–2	Dungannon Swifts
Ballyclare Comrades	1–1	Ards
Ballymena United	1–0	Coagh United
Bangor	1–5	Newry City^{1}
Carrick Rangers	1–5	Coleraine
Cliftonville	2–3	Banbridge Town
Glenavon	0–2	Portadown
Glentoran	6–0	Lisburn Rangers
Institute	4–0	Ballymoney United
Kilmore Recreation	1–0	Ballynure Old Boys
Larne	3–0	East Belfast
Linfield	1–1	Limavady United
Lisburn Distillery	4–1	Ballinamallard United
Loughgall	5–1	Donegal Celtic
Omagh Town	0–1	Crusaders
Tobermore United	0–2	Harland & Wolff Welders

^{1}Newry City were disqualified for fielding an ineligible player. Bangor were reinstated.

==== Replays ====
Team 1	Score	Team 2
Ballyclare Comrades	0–1	Ards
Limavady United	1–2	Linfield

=== Sixth round ===
Team 1	Score	Team 2
Ballymena United	4–1	Kilmore Recreation
Crusaders	0–1	Coleraine
Dungannon Swifts	1–2	Larne
Glentoran	1–1	Linfield
Institute	1–2	Ards
Lisburn Distillery	1–1	Harland & Wolff Welders
Loughgall	0–0	Banbridge Town
Portadown	2–1	Bangor

==== Replays ====
Team 1	Score	Team 2
Linfield	0–3	Glentoran
Lisburn Distillery	1–2	Harland & Wolff Welders
Loughgall	2–0	Banbridge Town

=== Quarter-finals ===
Team 1	Score	Team 2
Ards	0–1	Portadown
Ballymena United	0–0	Harland & Wolff Welders
Coleraine	1–2	Glentoran
Loughgall	1–1	Larne

==== Replays ====
Team 1	Score	Team 2
Ballymena United	4–0	Harland & Wolff Welders
Larne	3–0	Loughgall

=== Semi-finals ===
Team 1	Score	Team 2
Ballymena United	0–1	Larne
Glentoran	0–0	Portadown

==== Replay ====
Team 1	Score	Team 2
Portadown	1–0	Glentoran

=== Final ===
7 May 2005

Portadown	5 – 1	Larne
Arkins 15', 59'; Convery 34'; McCann 36'; Kelly 48'	Report	Ogden 3'

Windsor Park, Belfast
Attendance: 5,431
