= PRFC =

PRFC may refer to:

- Pasadena Rugby Football Club
- Paulton Rovers F.C.
- Peebles Rovers F.C.
- Penrhiwceiber Rangers F.C.
- Providence Rugby Football Club
- Portaferry Rovers F.C.
- Portavogie Rangers F.C.
- Portland Rugby Football Club (Maine)
- Portland Rugby Football Club (Oregon)
- Portsmouth Rugby Football Club
- Puerto Rico FC
