= Lee Bonis =

Northern Irish footballer (born 1999)

Personal information
- Full name: Jordan Lee Bonis
- Date of birth: 3 August 1999 (age 27)
- Place of birth: Craigavon, Northern Ireland
- Height: 1.83 m (6 ft 0 in)
- Position: Striker

Team information
- Current team: Chesterfield
- Number: 10

Youth career
- Portadown

Senior career*
Years	Team	Apps	(Gls)
- Portadown BBOB
–2019	Seagoe		
2019–2021	Portadown	81	(32)
2022–2024	Larne	85	(39)
2024–2025	ADO Den Haag	35	(11)
2025–	Chesterfield	20	(5)

International career^{‡}
2024–	Northern Ireland	4	(0)
- * Club domestic league appearances and goals as of 11 May 2025 ‡ National team caps and goals as of 21:58, 12 October 2024 (UTC)

Jordan Lee Bonis (born 3 August 1999) is a Northern Irish professional footballer who plays as a striker for EFL League Two club Chesterfield and the Northern Ireland national team.

== Club career ==
Bonis started his adult career in the non league game in Northern Ireland, with spells at Portadown BBOB and Seagoe, helping the latter to win the Alan Wilson Cup, having came through the youth system at Portadown, the club he has supported from a young age. In 2019, he signed for Irish League side Portadown. Before the second half of 2021–22, he signed for Irish Premiership side Larne.

=== ADO Den Haag ===
On 12 August 2024, Bonis signed for Dutch Eerste Divisie club ADO Den Haag on a two-year contract for an undisclosed fee. He scored 11 goals in 35 total appearances.

=== Chesterfield ===
On 30 June 2025, Bonis signed for English EFL League Two club Chesterfield for an undisclosed fee. He was named EFL League Two Player of the Month for December 2025 after a run of four goals in five games.

== International career ==
In 2023, Bonis was called up to the Northern Ireland national football team for the first time. He made his debut on 12 October 2024, coming on as substitute in a draw with Belarus in Hungary.

== Honours ==
Larne

- NIFL Premiership: 2022–23, 2023–24
- County Antrim Shield: 2021–22, 2022–23, 2023–24
- NIFL Charity Shield: 2024

Individual

- EFL League Two Player of the Month: December 2025
- NIFL Premiership Team of the Season: 2023–24
