= Jonny Evans =

Northern Irish footballer (born 1988)

Jonny Evans MBE
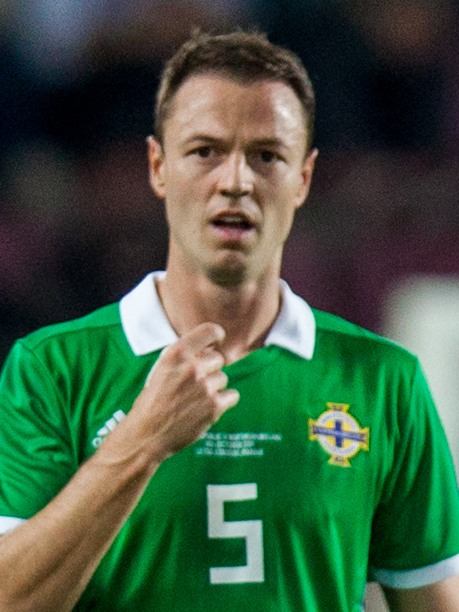
- Evans playing for Northern Ireland in 2019

Personal information
- Full name: Jonathan Grant Evans
- Date of birth: 3 January 1988 (age 38)
- Place of birth: Belfast, Northern Ireland
- Height: 6 ft 2 in (1.88 m)
- Position: Centre-back

Youth career
- Lisburn Youth
- Greenisland
- 2004–2006: Manchester United

Senior career*
Years	Team	Apps	(Gls)
2006–2015	Manchester United	131	(4)
2006	→ Royal Antwerp (loan)	11	(2)
2006–2007	→ Sunderland (loan)	18	(1)
2008	→ Sunderland (loan)	15	(0)
2015–2018	West Bromwich Albion	89	(5)
2018–2023	Leicester City	121	(5)
2023–2025	Manchester United	30	(0)
Total		415	(17)

International career
	Northern Ireland U16	6	(0)
2004–2005	Northern Ireland U17	8	(1)
2006	Northern Ireland U21	3	(0)
2006–2024	Northern Ireland	107	(6)
- * Club domestic league appearances and goals

Jonathan Grant Evans (born 3 January 1988) is a Northern Irish professional football coach and former player who played as a centre-back. He was most recently first-team coach at Premier League club Manchester United.

Evans started his career at Manchester United, having progressed through the club's youth academy. He went on loan to Royal Antwerp and Sunderland to gain first-team experience before making his first-team debut in 2007. Evans became a regular first-team squad member the following season, going on to play almost 200 matches for Manchester United and winning 11 trophies, including three Premier League titles, two League Cups and a UEFA Champions League. He fell out of favour at the club under manager Louis van Gaal and left for West Bromwich Albion in 2015. After West Brom's relegation three years later, Evans signed for Leicester City, where he won the FA Cup in 2021 and was made club captain in 2022. Following Leicester City's relegation in 2023, Evans returned to Manchester United in July, officially signing for the side in September, where he spent two seasons, winning another FA Cup in 2024. Having departed Manchester United at the end of the 2024–25 season, he announced his retirement from professional football in May 2025.

A full international from 2006 to 2024, Evans is the second-most decorated player in Northern Irish football history. He played over 100 matches for the Northern Ireland national team, including as an ever-present in the team's run to the round of 16 at UEFA Euro 2016, as well as serving as captain. He officially retired from international football in August 2024.

== Club career ==
=== Manchester United ===
Evans started out playing Carnmoney Colts, as well as Lisburn Youth in Drumbo until he was 15. He was then scouted while playing for Greenisland, the same club that his younger brother Corry and Craig Cathcart played for before moving to Manchester United. At the age of nine, he was invited to attend the Manchester United Centre of Excellence in Belfast, before being invited for a trial in Manchester a year later. Rule changes within The Football Association at the time meant that clubs were limited to players who lived within 90 minutes' travel of the club, so Evans' opportunities were limited. However, his family soon relocated to Manchester, allowing Evans to train with Manchester United full-time. He progressed through Manchester United's academy, featuring in two of the club's three games during the 2006 summer tour of South Africa, as well as domestic friendlies against Celtic and Preston North End, and in the Amsterdam Tournament against Ajax.

Alongside fellow youngsters Darron Gibson, Danny Simpson and Fraizer Campbell, Evans spent the first half of the 2006–07 season on loan at Manchester United's Belgian feeder club Royal Antwerp.

In December 2006, he agreed to join Sunderland on loan in the January transfer window until the end of the 2006–07 season, again along with Danny Simpson. The pair helped Sunderland clinch the Championship title, with Evans winning the club's Youth Player of the Year award at the end of the season. Sunderland manager Roy Keane was hopeful of re-signing Evans on another loan following their promotion to the Premier League, though United elected to keep him to push for a place in the first team.

Evans ultimately rejoined Sunderland for a second loan spell on 4 January 2008, and was immediately drafted into the first team squad in a 3–0 loss to Wigan Athletic in the FA Cup. He played the full 90 minutes but was criticised for Wigan's second goal of the game, prior to which he lost the ball on the edge of his own box, resulting in a deflected own goal by Paul McShane. Making 15 league appearances, Evans helped Sunderland avoid relegation back to the Championship.

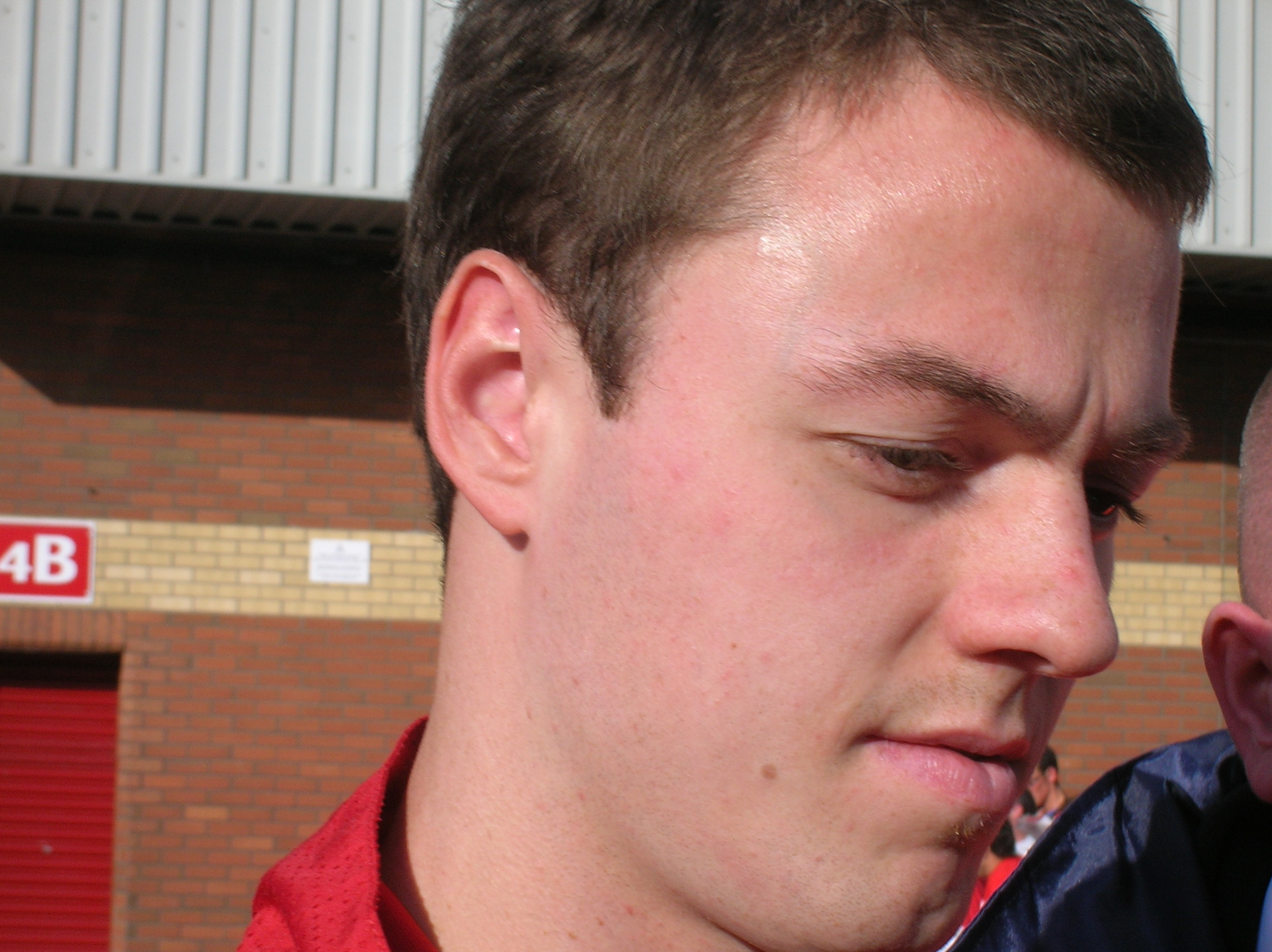
Evans with Manchester United in 2009

Evans made his Manchester United debut on 26 September 2007 against Coventry City in the League Cup which ended in a 2–0 defeat. He then appeared as a late substitute for Gerard Piqué in a UEFA Champions League match at home to Dynamo Kyiv on 7 November 2007 to secure Manchester United's qualification to the knockout stage of the competition. He subsequently made his first Champions League start on 12 December 2007 against Roma.

Evans made his league debut for United in a 1–1 draw with Chelsea on 21 September 2008, filling in for the suspended Nemanja Vidić. In December 2008, Evans made two substitute appearances at the FIFA Club World Cup, including one in the final after Vidić was sent off shortly after half-time. Evans continued to deputise throughout the rest of the season, appearing in a number of league games and in the League Cup final.

At the beginning of the 2010–11 football season, Evans became a regular fixture in the United team, partnering Vidić in the centre of defence in the absence of the injured Rio Ferdinand. On 19 March 2011, Evans injured Bolton Wanderers midfielder Stuart Holden with a tackle which ruled Holden out initially for six months, though eventually caused the United States international to be side-lined for 22 months. Despite Evans receiving a straight red card for the tackle, Manchester United went on to win the game 1–0 with a Dimitar Berbatov goal.

Before the start of the 2011–12 season, Evans was handed the number 6 shirt after Wes Brown was transferred to Sunderland. On 14 August, he wore his new shirt number for the first time in United's opening day 2–1 win at West Bromwich Albion, coming on for the injured Vidić in the 52nd minute at The Hawthorns. On 23 October, he was sent off in United's 6–1 defeat against Manchester City after bringing down Mario Balotelli in a last-man challenge. Evans made his 100th appearance for the Red Devils on 30 November, playing the full 120 minutes as United lost 2–1 to Championship side Crystal Palace in the League Cup quarter-final. On 18 March 2012, he scored his first goal for United, opening the scoring in a 5–0 league win away to Wolverhampton Wanderers. Evans missed the final three games of the season with a foot injury.

Having undergone surgery to repair an ankle injury at the end of the previous season, Evans was unable to commence his preseason training until early August. Evans scored his second goal for the club in a 3–0 win away at Newcastle United on 7 October 2012, thumping home a header from a Robin van Persie corner. On 23 October, he scored his first UEFA Champions League goal and his first at Old Trafford, scrambling home from a corner kick the 2-2 equaliser in a 3–2 victory over Braga. Evans netted his third goal of the season on 24 November 2012, heading in the equaliser from a corner to begin a 3–1 comeback victory against Queens Park Rangers at Old Trafford. On 21 December 2012, Evans signed a new contract with United which would keep him at the club until June 2016. He scored his third league goal of the season and fourth overall on Boxing Day in a 4–3 win against Newcastle, tapping home after Javier Hernández's shot had been saved by Tim Krul. He scored an own goal moments later, turning into his own net a cross from former United, Antwerp and Sunderland teammate Danny Simpson.

On 4 March 2015, Newcastle striker Papiss Cissé spat at Evans after Evans spat in Cissé's direction following an altercation. Neither player was punished by the referee during the game, though both were charged by the FA after review. Evans denied the charge and said "I would like to make it clear that I did not spit at Papiss Cissé. Having woken up this morning, I am shocked to have seen the media coverage from last night's match." He was banned for six games on 7 March, with Cissé banned for seven due to a previous suspension.

=== West Bromwich Albion ===
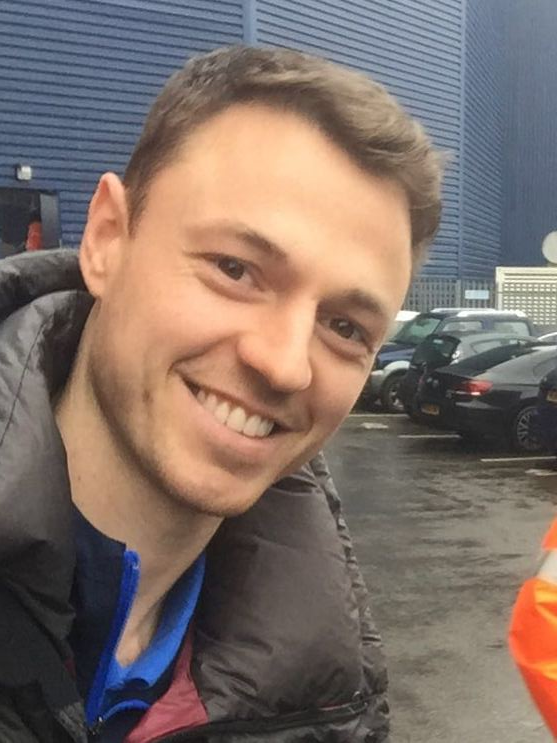
Evans in 2017

Evans signed for Premier League club West Bromwich Albion for an undisclosed fee on 29 August 2015. He made his debut for the club on 12 September 2015 in a 0–0 draw against Southampton. On 2 January 2016, Evans scored his first West Brom goal in a 2–1 victory over Stoke City. On 15 May 2016, before the final game of the season, he received the Players' Player of the Season award for his first season at the club.

He had to wait a long time for his next goal, which came in a 3–1 win over Watford on 3 December 2016. His next goal came in a 2–1 loss against Swansea on the final game of the season.

In July 2017, following the departure of club skipper Darren Fletcher to Stoke City, Evans was confirmed permanent captain by head coach Tony Pulis. He scored his first goal of the season on 30 September 2017 in a 2–2 draw against Watford, scoring a header as he had done ten months earlier against the same opponent. His second goal of the season was against Brighton at home on 13 January 2018, which brought his side's first league win in five months and 20 games.

=== Leicester City ===
In June 2018, Leicester City triggered the £3.5 million relegation release clause in Evans' West Brom contract. He signed a three-year contract with the Foxes, and made his Leicester debut in a 2–0 victory over Wolverhampton Wanderers on 18 August 2018. He scored his first goal for the club in a 4–1 defeat to Crystal Palace on 23 February 2019.

Evans made his 400th appearance in English football on 12 July 2020 and scored an own goal in a 4–1 defeat away to AFC Bournemouth in the Premier League.

Ahead of the 2022–23 season, Evans was appointed captain following the departure of previous captain Kasper Schmeichel.

=== Return to Manchester United ===
After training with Manchester United following his release by Leicester at the end of the 2022–23 season, it was announced on 18 July that Evans had signed a short-term deal with the club, allowing him to travel with the squad for a pre-season friendly against Lyon in Edinburgh. On 1 September, it was announced that Evans had signed a one-year contract with the club. Two days later, he made his return debut against Arsenal as a substitute, where Declan Rice's shot deflected off him in stoppage time to make it 2–1, in a match which ended in a 3–1 defeat. Following an injury to Lisandro Martínez, Evans was handed his first start of the season on 23 September in a 1–0 win against Burnley, with Evans assisting the winner scored by Bruno Fernandes. It also marked his 200th appearance for the club in all competitions.

Evans played in the 2024 FA Cup final against local rivals Manchester City and helped United win 2–1. This meant he had completed a milestone in winning every major trophy possible with United. On 12 July 2024, Evans signed a new one-year contract with the club. He took part in the 2024 FA Community Shield, another Manchester derby game which was level after 90 minutes and went to a penalty shootout. Evans took United's seventh penalty, shooting over the bar allowing City to win the shield 7–6.

On 19 December 2024, Evans scored his first goal since his return to Manchester United, in a 4–3 defeat to Tottenham in the EFL Cup quarter-finals. In late May 2025, it was announced that he would leave the club following the expiration of his contract at the end of the 2024–25 season. On 30 May 2025, Evans played his last professional football match against Hong Kong during a post-season Asia tour. After the match, he retired from professional football, totalling over 600 appearances for club and country in 19 years. Upon retirement, he was appointed to a role in the club's youth development setup.

== International career ==
Before making his senior debut for Manchester United, Evans was called up to the full Northern Ireland squad for the first time in September 2006, and made his debut in the memorable 3–2 victory over Spain. On 28 March 2009, Evans scored his first international goal in a 3–2 win over Poland in 2010 FIFA World Cup qualification, volleying home from close range.

On 28 May 2016, Evans was included by national team manager Michael O'Neill in Northern Ireland's final 23-man squad for UEFA Euro 2016. This was the first time Northern Ireland had ever been involved in the finals of the competition, and their first major tournament since the 1986 FIFA World Cup. The team eventually reached the round of 16, being knocked out by Wales after a 1–0 defeat. Evans participated in all four of Northern Ireland's games in the tournament.

His second international goal came eight and a half years after his first on 4 September 2017, via a header in a 2–0 victory against the Czech Republic in 2018 FIFA World Cup qualification. Northern Ireland reached a November playoff versus Switzerland, aiming to qualify for the World Cup for the first time in 32 years. They suffered a 1–0 defeat in the first leg with the winner coming from a controversial penalty awarded by Romanian referee Ovidiu Hategan. Corry Evans was penalised for handball, though the ball clearly struck the player's shoulder; manager Michael O'Neill said it was the worst decision he had ever seen in a game he had been involved in. A goalless draw in the second leg three days later meant Northern Ireland were eliminated from qualification. Evans nearly scored a winner in injury time of the second leg which would have levelled the aggregate score; his header beat Switzerland goalkeeper Yann Sommer but was cleared off the line by defender Ricardo Rodriguez, who had converted the penalty in the first leg.

Evans scored his third goal at senior international level when he opened the scoring against Belarus in Northern Ireland's second game of the Euro 2020 qualification phase. On 27 September 2022 in the Nations League game against Greece, he became the fourth player to make 100 appearances for Northern Ireland.

On 28 August 2024, after 107 caps, Evans retired from international football.

== Post-playing career ==
On 30 June 2025, Evans was appointed as head of loans and pathways at Manchester United. The role is focused around maximising the development of United's young players. He left this role in December 2025.

On 6 January 2026, after the sacking of Ruben Amorim, Manchester United interim head coach Darren Fletcher confirmed that Evans had returned to the club to assist him with the coaching and preparation of United's next Premier League fixture against Burnley. A week later, when United appointed Michael Carrick as head coach until the end of the 2025–26 season, the club confirmed that Evans would continue to work with the first-team and form part of Carrick's coaching staff.

== Personal life ==
Evans was born in Belfast. He was a student at Belfast High School in Newtownabbey before being enrolled at Ashton-on-Mersey School in Sale, Greater Manchester, once he had been signed by Manchester United. He holds nine GCSEs, all A* or A grades.

On 19 December 2007, Evans was arrested in connection with an alleged rape that occurred at the hotel where Manchester United's Christmas party was held. On 8 March 2008, it was reported that he would not be prosecuted for any offence.

On 1 June 2013, Evans married Helen McConnell, an MUTV reporter, at Clough Presbyterian Church in Clough, Northern Ireland. As of December 2019, the couple have three children.

Evans was appointed Member of the Order of the British Empire (MBE) in the 2023 Birthday Honours for services to association football in Northern Ireland.

== Career statistics ==
=== Club ===
Appearances and goals by club, season and competition
Club	Season	League			National cup (Note: Includes FA Cup, Belgian Cup)		League cup (Note: Includes Football League/EFL Cup)		Europe		Other		Total	
Club	Season	Division	Apps	Goals	Apps	Goals	Apps	Goals	Apps	Goals	Apps	Goals	Apps	Goals
Manchester United	2006–07	Premier League	0	0	—		—		—		—		0	0
Manchester United	2007–08	Premier League	0	0	—		1	0	2 (Note: Appearances in UEFA Champions League)	0	0	0	3	0
Manchester United	2008–09	Premier League	17	0	3	0	5	0	7	0	2 (Note: Appearances in FIFA Club World Cup)	0	34	0
Manchester United	2009–10	Premier League	18	0	1	0	5	0	3	0	1 (Note: Appearance in FA Community Shield)	0	28	0
Manchester United	2010–11	Premier League	13	0	2	0	2	0	3	0	1	0	21	0
Manchester United	2011–12	Premier League	29	1	1	0	1	0	8 (Note: Four appearances in UEFA Champions League, four appearances in UEFA Europa League)	0	1	0	40	1
Manchester United	2012–13	Premier League	23	3	2	0	0	0	5	1	—		30	4
Manchester United	2013–14	Premier League	17	0	1	0	4	1	3	1	0	0	25	2
Manchester United	2014–15	Premier League	14	0	2	0	1	0	—		—		17	0
Manchester United	Total		131	4	12	0	19	1	31	2	5	0	198	7
Royal Antwerp (loan)	2006–07	Belgian Second Division	11	2	3	0	—		—		—		14	2
Sunderland (loan)	2006–07	Championship	18	1	1	0	0	0	—		—		19	1
Sunderland (loan)	2007–08	Premier League	15	0	1	0	—		—		—		16	0
Sunderland (loan)	Total		33	1	2	0	0	0	—		—		35	1
West Bromwich Albion	2015–16	Premier League	30	1	4	0	0	0	—		—		34	1
West Bromwich Albion	2016–17	Premier League	31	2	0	0	0	0	—		—		31	2
West Bromwich Albion	2017–18	Premier League	28	2	2	0	1	0	—		—		31	2
West Bromwich Albion	Total		89	5	6	0	1	0	—		—		96	5
Leicester City	2018–19	Premier League	24	1	1	0	3	0	—		—		28	1
Leicester City	2019–20	Premier League	38	1	2	0	6	1	—		—		46	2
Leicester City	2020–21	Premier League	28	2	4	0	0	0	5 (Note: Appearances in UEFA Europa League)	0	—		37	2
Leicester City	2021–22	Premier League	18	1	0	0	1	0	8 (Note: Four appearances and one goal in UEFA Europa League, four appearances in UEFA Europa Conference League)	1	0	0	27	2
Leicester City	2022–23	Premier League	13	0	0	0	1	0	—		—		14	0
Leicester City	Total		121	5	7	0	11	1	13	1	0	0	152	7
Manchester United	2023–24	Premier League	23	0	4	0	1	0	2	0	—		30	0
Manchester United	2024–25	Premier League	7	0	0	0	3	1	2	0	1	0	13	1
Manchester United	Total		30	0	4	0	4	1	4	0	1	0	43	1
Career total			415	17	34	0	35	3	48	3	6	0	538	23

=== International ===
Appearances and goals by national team and year
National team	Year	Apps	Goals
Northern Ireland	2006	3	0
Northern Ireland	2007	5	0
Northern Ireland	2008	7	0
Northern Ireland	2009	5	1
Northern Ireland	2010	5	0
Northern Ireland	2011	4	0
Northern Ireland	2012	4	0
Northern Ireland	2013	6	0
Northern Ireland	2015	6	0
Northern Ireland	2016	13	0
Northern Ireland	2017	9	1
Northern Ireland	2018	9	0
Northern Ireland	2019	8	2
Northern Ireland	2020	5	0
Northern Ireland	2021	4	0
Northern Ireland	2022	7	1
Northern Ireland	2023	6	1
Northern Ireland	2024	1	0
Total		107	6

Scores and results list Northern Ireland's goal tally first

List of international goals scored by Jonny Evans
No.	Date	Venue	Opponent	Score	Result	Competition
1	28 March 2009	Windsor Park, Belfast, Northern Ireland	Poland	2–1	3–2	2010 FIFA World Cup qualification
2	4 September 2017	Windsor Park, Belfast, Northern Ireland	Czech Republic	1–0	2–0	2018 FIFA World Cup qualification
3	24 March 2019	Windsor Park, Belfast, Northern Ireland	Belarus	1–0	2–1	UEFA Euro 2020 qualifying
4	14 October 2019	Stadion Letná, Prague, Czech Republic	Czech Republic	2–0	3–2	Friendly
5	12 June 2022	Windsor Park, Belfast, Northern Ireland	Cyprus	2–2	2–2	2022–23 UEFA Nations League C
6	7 September 2023	Stožice Stadium, Ljubljana, Slovenia	Slovenia	2–3	2–4	UEFA Euro 2024 qualifying

== Honours ==
Sunderland

- Football League Championship: 2006–07

Manchester United

- Premier League: 2008–09, 2010–11, 2012–13
- FA Cup: 2023–24
- Football League Cup: 2008–09, 2009–10
- FA Community Shield: 2008, 2010, 2011, 2013
- UEFA Champions League: 2007–08; runner-up: 2008–09
- FIFA Club World Cup: 2008
- UEFA Europa League runner-up: 2024–25

Leicester City

- FA Cup: 2020–21

Orders

- Member of the Order of the British Empire (MBE): 2023

== See also ==
- List of European association football families
- List of men's footballers with 100 or more international caps
