= Ballymena & Provincial Football League =

Association football league in Northern Ireland

- Founded: 1948
- Country: Northern Ireland
- Number of clubs: 53 (11 in Premier)
- Level on pyramid: 4 (Premier only)
- Promotion to: NCL League Two (to be created in 2027)
- Domestic cup(s): Irish Cup; IFA Intermediate Cup
- Current champions: Strabane Athletic (2024–25)
- Most championships: Moyola Park (6 titles)

The Ballymena and Provincial Football League is a regional football league in Northern Ireland. The league has a Premier Division with intermediate status and three junior divisions: Junior Divisions 1, 2 and 3.

== History ==
The league was formed as the Ballymena and District Junior League in 1948, with twelve founding members, including Moyola Park F.C., the only original member club that still retains membership through its reserve team. In 1983, the name was changed to the Ballymena and District Premier League, and in 1990, intermediate status was granted to the top division and the league was renamed as the Ballymena and Provincial Intermediate League. The league subsequently changed its name again to the current Ballymena and Provincial Football League.

In 2023, the league announced a re-structure of the league in order to expand into two tiers (a Division One and Division Two) for the start of the 2024–25 season.

== Intermediate clubs in membership (2025–26) ==
Currently, eighteen teams play in the Intermediate Division, and twenty-nine play in the Junior Divisions. The league champions can be promoted to NIFL Premier Intermediate League, providing they meet the admittance requirements.

Intermediate Division 1

- Ballymoney United
- Belfast Celtic
- Dunloy
- Desertmartin
- Newtowne
- Newbuildings United
- St James Swifts
- Strabane Athletic
- Wellington Rec
- Wakehurst

Intermediate Division 2

- Ballynure Old Boys
- Brantwood
- Chimney Corner
- Maiden City
- Heights
- Glebe Rangers
- Cookstown Youth
- Killymoon Rangers
- Rathcoole
- Inspired Talents

== Cups ==
Cups that are currently available only to clubs in the Ballymena & Provincial Intermediate Leagues are:

- Crawford Cup;
- McReynolds Cup;
- O'Gorman Cup;
- Canada Trophy;
- Linda Welshman Memorial Cup;

Teams in the junior divisions can play in the Irish Junior Cup.

== List of champions ==
Season	Champions
1948-49	Moyola Park
1949-50	Moyola Park
1951-1959	unknown
1959-60	Moyola Park/Ballymoney United
1961-1973	unknown
1973-74	Moyola Park
1976-1976	unknown
1976-77	Moyola Park
1977-78	Moyola Park
1979–2006	unknown
2006–07	Raceview
2007–08	Ballynure Old Boys
2008–09	Coleraine Crusaders
2009–10	Raceview
2010–11	Brantwood
2011–12	Raceview
2012–13	Newtowne
2013–14	Brantwood
2014–15	Ballynure Old Boys
2015–16	Newtowne
2016–17	Coagh United
2017–18	Glebe Rangers
2018–19	Bangor
2021–22	St James' Swifts
2022–23	Coagh United
2023–24	Strabane Athletic
2024–25	Strabane Athletic
2025-26	St James’ Swifts

Source: nifootball
