= Finaghy F.C. =

Finaghy Football Club
- Founded: 1962
- Ground: Breda Park
- Manager: Chris Stewart
- League: Northern Amateur Football League

Finaghy Football Club, or referred to simply as Finaghy, are a Northern Irish football club based in Finaghy, Belfast, Northern Ireland. Finaghy F.C. were founded in 1962 as Lowe Memorial Young Men. The Lowe Memorial YM completed in the Churches League up until 1982. They play in the Northern Amateur Football League. They play in the Irish Cup, and other Northern Irish football cup competitions.

Finaghy FC's home ground is Breda Park, located on the Upper Braniel Road, and their home colours are maroon.

== History ==
Fianghy Football Club were founded in 1962 by members of the Lowe Memorial Presbyterian Church. One of these was an official in junior football circles, Sam Devlin.

They played in the Churches League between twenty years, and then joined the NAFL in 1982.

They were crowned champions of 2A league in 2022, following a promotion in 2021. In the 2023/24 season, Finaghy became Division 1C winners.

In the 2025-26 Irish Cup, Finaghy reached the 4th round. They beat Dromore Amateurs in round one 5-2 away. In round two, Finaghy beat Shamrock 4-3 away. In round three, they were playing away again, this time, beating Holywood 5-3. They eventually lost to Lisburn Distillery 4-2, also away from home in round 4.

== Club honours ==
- Northern Amateur Football League
  - Division 2A
    - 2021/22
  - Division 2B
    - 2015/16
  - Division 1C
    - 2023/24
- IFA Junior Cup
  - 1977
