= Pasadena Rugby Football Club =

Pasadena RFC
- Full name: Pasadena Rugby Football Club
- Union: USA Rugby
- Nickname(s): PRFC
- Founded: 1971
- Ground(s): No Current, Permanent Field
- President: Michael Bryant
- League(s): SCRFU, Division II,

Official website
- www.pasadenarfc.com

The Pasadena Rugby Football Club is a rugby union club based in Pasadena, California. PRFC competes in the Southern California Rugby Football Union's Division II.

== History ==
The club was founded in 1971 by former Japanese national scrum-half Kei Takarabe with the merging of the Warlords and Crown City Rugby Football Clubs which were located in Pasadena, California. For over 30 years, the Club has maintained a strong rugby tradition in the highly competitive SCRFU.

== Teams ==
Pasadena RFC consists of a growing Youth (U8, U10, U12, U14), Junior (U16 and U18), Women's (The Royals), second side men's (The Warlords) and first side men's teams. PRFC also fields competitive Rugby Sevens teams over the Summer. In addition to our current teams, PRFC has a vibrant and active Old Boys team, the Owls, that host an Alumni Old Boys game every season.

== Successes ==
Pasadena RFC have featured in the Southern California Rugby Football Union's Playoffs a few times, having advanced and competed multiple times throughout the club's history.

== Sponsorship ==
Pasadena RFC's primary sponsor is SADA Systems. In addition to SADA Systems, PRFC has individual sponsorship from multiple local and regional businesses.

== Charity ==
The club is a recognized by the IRS as a 501(c)(3) charitable organization. PRFC also actively participates in the Holidays From the Heart Charity sponsored by the Children's Hospital Los Angeles each year.
