= A.F.C. Craigavon =

- Full name: Association Football Club Craigavon
- Founded: 1978 (original formation); 2016 (merger with Silverwood United)
- Ground: Lakeview Park
- League: Mid-Ulster Football League

Association Football Club Craigavon, also known as A.F.C. Craigavon and between 2016 and 2023 as A.F.C. Silverwood, is a Northern Irish football club which plays in the Mid-Ulster Football League. The club is based in Craigavon, County Armagh. A.F.C. Craigavon are a member of the Mid-Ulster Football Association.

The club was originally founded in 1978 following the amalgamation of two clubs, entered the Mid-Ulster League, and later the Mid-Ulster Intermediate League. In 1991, the club joined the Northern Amateur Football League. In 2016, it merged with Silverwood United and was known as "A.F.C. Silverwood". By 2023, the amalgamated club had reverted to using the name A.F.C. Craigavon.

A.F.C Craigavon competes in the Irish Cup.
