= St Matthews F.C. =

St Matthews Football Club
- Nicknames: Saints, The Short Strand
- Founded: 1970
- Ground: Ormeau Park
- Manager: Lance Shields
- League: Northern Amateur Football League

St Matthews Football Club, referred to simply as St Matthews, is an intermediate football club playing in the Northern Amateur Football League. They are based in Short Strand, Belfast, Northern Ireland. St Matthews were established in 1970, and play in Ormeau Park, Belfast. They train at Ashfield Boys High School. They play in the Irish Cup.

== History ==
In 2023, St Matthews FC became champions of the NAFL 2A.

In 2024, Belfast City Council paid out £30k as a part of the football pitches strategy from the People and Communities Committee. This would be from a one year period pending development from the pitches strategy.

== Club honours ==
- Northern Amateur Football League
  - Division 2A
    - 2022-23
