= F.C. Mindwell =

Mindwell
- Full name: Football Club Mindwell
- Founded: 2020
- Ground: Holm Park
- Chairman: Andy Cully
- League: Mid-Ulster Football League

F.C. Mindwell, referred to simply as Mindwell, is an intermediate-level football club playing in the Intermediate A division of the Mid-Ulster Football League in Northern Ireland. The club is based in Banbridge and has two senior Men's teams, the Mindwell reserves play in the Mid-Ulster Reserves Leagues. F.C. Mindwell was established in 2020 to promote men’s mental health awareness and provide support to the community.

Mindwell is a member of the Mid-Ulster Football Association, and the club's senior team compete in the Irish Cup, as well as regional cup competitions. In the 2025-26 Irish Cup, they reached round 3, beating Crewe United and Castlewellan Town in the previous rounds.

== Club identity and mental health ==
In 2020, the FC Mindwell launch and project was unveiled at the Crowne Plaza Hotel in Belfast. This unveiling was done with the goal to help people with mental health disorders. The program included a range of former Irish League and Northern Ireland international Keith Gillespie. Gillespie came out of retirement to play for F.C. Mindwell.

The club's official ambassador is former England and Liverpool goalkeeper Chris Kirkland.

FC Mindwell works with a charity known as Links Counselling Service to aid families to prevent mental health conditions.

== Ground, colours and crest ==
F.C. Mindwell play their home games at Holm Park, Ballynahonemore Road in Armagh. Their home colours are yellow and black. The away kit is black and white.

The FC Mindwell crest depicts a lion, which represents internal strength and courage. This relates to the bravery to speak up about mental health struggles.

== Honours ==
Mid-Ulster Football League

- Division 2
  - 2022/23
- Division 3
  - 2021/22
- Alan Wilson Cup
  - 2024/25
