= Ambassadors F.C. =

Association football club in Northern Ireland

Ambassadors
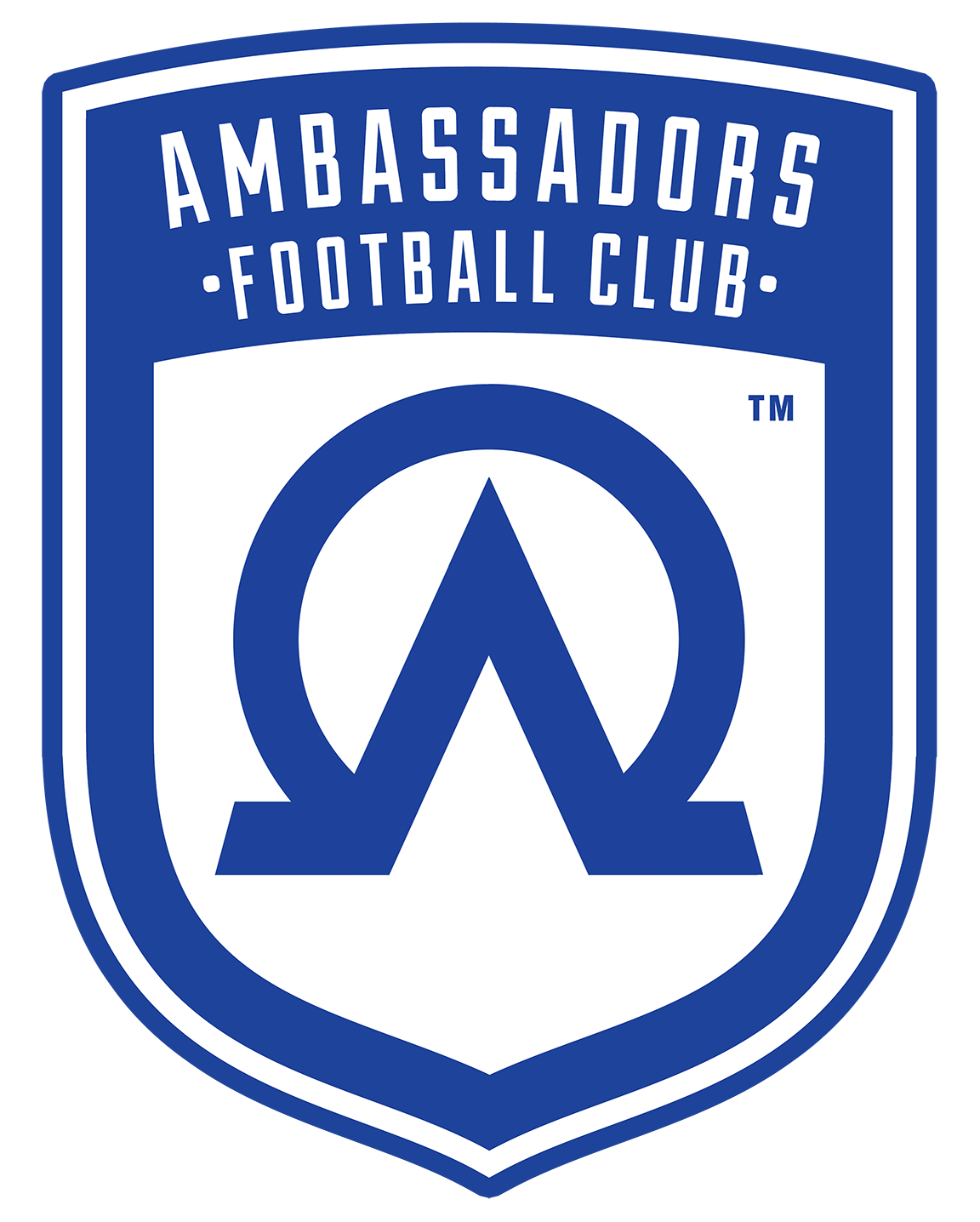
- Nickname: The Dors
- Founded: 2006
- League: Mid-Ulster Football League Intermediate B
Home colours	Away colours

Ambassadors Football Club is an intermediate-level football club playing in the Intermediate B division of the Mid-Ulster Football League in Northern Ireland. The club, which is based in County Armagh, has three men's senior teams, a senior ladies team who play in NIWFA Division 2. They also have a boys and girls youth academy. The club's senior team plays in the Irish Cup. The club forms part of the Mid-Ulster Football Association. Their home kit is blue whilst they predominantly play their away fixtures in black.

The club, which has a "Christian ethos", is part of the global sports ministry "Ambassadors Football". It previously played its senior home games at Ashgrove Park in Markethill, with training also occurring at pitches in Richhill, Armagh and Portadown. In 2023, a 21-year lease was signed for use of the old Brownlow Leisure Centre pitches in Craigavon.
