= Newmills F.C. =

Newmills
- Full name: Newmills Football Club
- Founded: 2011
- Ground: Newmills Playing Fields
- League: Mid-Ulster Football League

Newmills Football Club, referred to simply as Newmills, is a Northern Irish intermediate football club based in Newmills, Dungannon, County Tyrone. The club plays Division A of the Mid-Ulster Football League. Newmills, which was established in 2011, forms part of the Mid-Ulster Football Association.

They play their home games at Newmills Playing Fields. The reserves team also play in the Mid-Ulster Reserves Leagues. Newmills reserves won the Mid Ulster League Cup in the 2021/22 season.

== History ==
Newmills joined the Mid-Ulster Football League in 2012, and gained promotion from Division 3 into Divisions, 2 and 1. They then made the step up to the Intermediate League 2, and making it to the Intermediate 1, the top division in the Mid-Ulster Football League.

== Honours ==
- Mid-Ulster Football League
  - Mid Ulster League Cup
    - 2021/22
