= Heights F.C. =

Heights
- Full name: Heights Football Club
- Founded: 1974
- Ground: Andersons Park
- League: Ballymena & Provincial Football League Division 1

Heights Football Club is an intermediate-level football club playing in the Ballymena & Provincial Football League Division 1 in Northern Ireland. The club is based in Coleraine, Londonderry. Heights was founded in 1974. The club plays in the Irish Cup.

Heights were crowned champions of the BPFL Division 2 in 2025 with a 97th-minute goal against Glebe Rangers to secure the championship.

== Colours, ground and crest ==
They play their home games at Andersons Park, and wear royal blue and black strips as their home kit. The crest features a white dove.

== Honours ==
- Ballymena & Provincial Football League
  - Division 2
    - 2024/25
  - O'Gorman Cup
    - Runners-up 2024/25
