= Inspired Talents F.C. =

Inspired Talents
- Full name: Inspired Talents Football Club
- Nickname: Inspired
- Founded: 2022
- Ground: Mill Meadow
- Owner: Inspired Community Football Northern Ireland
- League: Ballymena & Provincial Football League

Inspired Talents Football Club, also known as Inspired Community, or simply Inspired, is an intermediate-level football club playing in the Ballymena & Provincial Football League Division 1 in Northern Ireland. The club is based in Castledawson, Magherafelt, County Londonderry. Inspired was founded in 2022, the ICFNI focuses on inclusion and diversity for minority groups in Northern Ireland. The club plays in the Irish Cup.

The club plays its home games at Mill Meadow. Their home colours are navy blue.

== Inspired community Football Northern Ireland ==
Inspired Community Football Northern Ireland (ICFNI) is a non-profit community amateur sports club that uses football to inspire positive change. The organization focuses on improving the attitude, education, and aspirations of young people and individuals, particularly those from minority communities who are disengaged. ICFNI is governed by a constitution and a three-member committee.

The organization uses football as a channel to engage young people from minority communities who are disengaged from society, with the goal of improving their attitude, performance, education, and aspirations.
