= Willowbank F.C. =

Willowbank Football Club
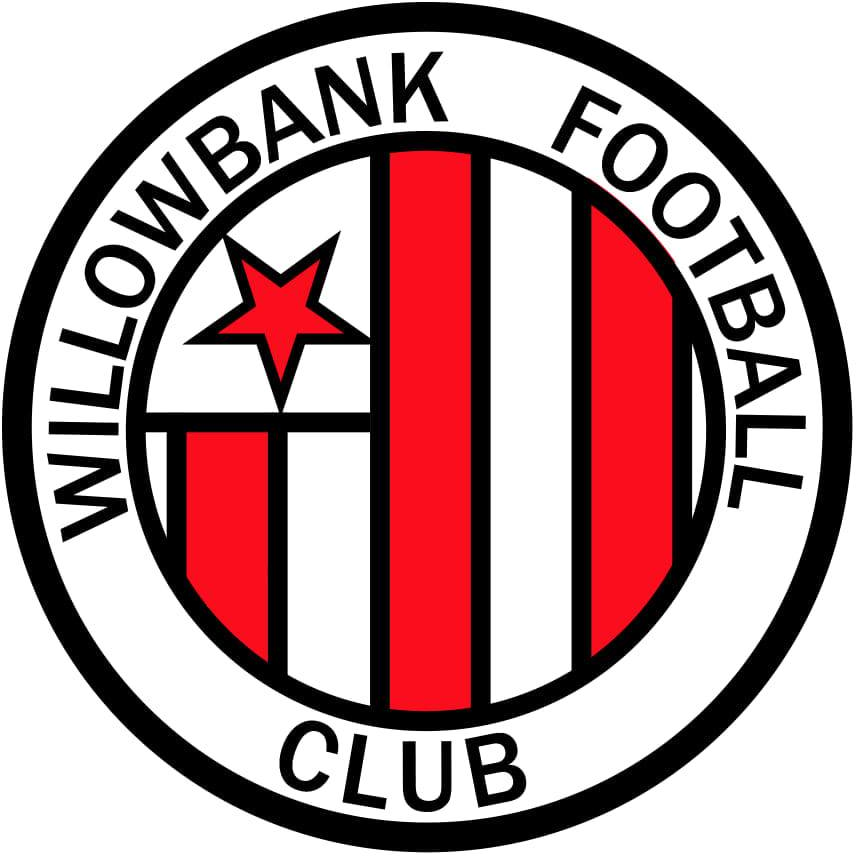
- Founded: 1969
- Ground: The Cliff (Sports complex)
- League: Northern Amateur Football League

Willowbank Football Club, referred to simply as Willowbank, is an intermediate football club playing in the Northern Amateur Football League. Willowbank were established 1969. They are based on the Falls Road, in West Belfast, Northern Ireland, and play their home games at The Cliff. They play in the Irish Cup.

== History ==
Willowbank were first formed in 1969, but had become inactive in the 1990s.

During the 2000s, Willowbank came back into existence, playing five-a-side football. They then submitted some teams in the Down & Connor Youth Leagues. Willowbank then entered the Belfast & District Football League.

In the 2016/17 season, Willowbank when undefeated across the season in the Belfast and District Football League. They made it a double, going on to win the B&D Nelson Cup.

In the 2017/18 season, Willowbank joined the Northern Amateur Football League and won the 2C Division in their first season in. In the 19/19 season, they won 2B, making it back-to-back promotions.

In 2020, Willowbank supported their community during Lockdown due to the COVID-19 pandemic. They supplied over 100 footballs and cones in an effort to support people's mental and physical health.

Willowbank won the 2023/23 Division 1C.

In the 2023/24 season, Willowbank won a double, the Border Cup and league winners of Division 1B. This made it another back-to-back promotion as champions.

In 2024, they reached the Steel & Sons Cup final, losing 1 - 0 to Derriaghy Cricket Club.

== Club honours ==
Northern Amateur Football League

- Division 1B
  - 2023/24
- Division 1C
  - 2022/23
- Division 2B
  - 2018/19
- Division 2C
  - 2017/18
- NAFL Border Cup
  - 2023/24

County Antrim Football Association

- CAFA Junior Shield
  - 2018/19
- CAFA Junior Shield
  - 2021/22

Irish Football Association

- IFA Junior Cup
  - 2019/20

Belfast and District League

- Premier Division
  - 2016/17
- Nelson Cup
  - 2016/17
