= Rathcoole F.C. =

Association football club in Northern Ireland

Rathcoole
- Full name: Rathcoole Football Club
- Founded: 2012
- League: Ballymena & Provincial Football League First Division
- 2015–16: Ballymena & Provincial Football League Premier Division, 9th

Rathcoole Football Club are a junior-level football club playing in the first division of the Ballymena & Provincial League in Northern Ireland. The club was founded in 2012. The club is based in Rathcoole, Newtownabbey, County Antrim, playing their home games at the Diamond, a two pitch facility that they share with Rathfern Rangers. They gained intermediate status in 2013 and competed in the Irish Cup for the first time in 2015–16, reaching the second round. However the club returned to the junior ranks for the 2016–17 season by dropping down a division. Rathcoole then folded in July 2017 and rebuilt the team and registered themselves again for the 2017–2018 season.
