= Dundonald F.C. =

Association football club in Northern Ireland

Dundonald
- Full name: Dundonald Football Club
- Nickname: The Duns
- Founded: 1956
- Ground: Billy Neill Centre, Dundonald
- Chairman: Michael Preston
- Manager: Scott Harvey
- League: NAFL Division 1B

Dundonald Football Club, referred to simply as Dundonald, or "The Duns", is a Northern Irish, intermediate football club playing in Division 1C of the Northern Amateur Football League. The club is based in Dundonald, County Down, and was formed in 1956. The club plays in the Irish Cup.

Lee Cathcart took over as Dundonald F.C. manager in 2024. After finishing the season as champions, Scott Harvey took the reins as manager for the 2025/26 season.

== Colours and badge ==
Dundonald play in red and black stripes, in which also appears on the badge. The badge also depicts a motte-and-bailey, in which the fort no longer stands. The Moat Hill is located in Moat Park, Dundonald, dating back to Normandy. A football and year of establishment is also featured.

== Club honours ==
- Northern Amateur Football League
  - NAFL Division 1B
    - 2009/10
  - NAFL Division 1C
    - 2024/25
- Cup competitions
  - Louis Moore Cup
    - 1965/66
  - Clarence Cup
    - 1967/68
  - Steel & Sons Cup
    - Runners-up 1970
- Reserves Leagues
  - NAFL Division 3B
    - 1991/92
  - NAFL Division 3C
    - 2000/1
  - NAFL Division 3D
    - 2024/25
  - NAFL Division 3E
    - 2008/09, 2022/23
