= Portadown BBOB F.C. =

- Sport: Association football
- Founded: 1975
- League: Mid-Ulster Football League
- Division: Intermediate B
- Based in: Portadown
- Home ground: Killicomaine Community Centre, Portadown, Northern Ireland

Portadown BBOB Football Club is an intermediate-level football club playing in the Intermediate B division of the Mid-Ulster Football League in Northern Ireland. The club is part of the Mid-Ulster Football Association.
