= Portavogie Rangers F.C. =

- Nicknames: Rangers, The Vogie
- Founded: 1961
- Ground: New Harbour Road, Portavogie
- Chairman: Mark Thompson
- Manager: Peter Doherty
- League: Northern Amateur Football League Division 1C
- 2025–26: NAFL Division 1C, 9th of 13

Portavogie Rangers Football Club is an intermediate football club based in Portavogie, County Down, Northern Ireland. Founded in 1961, the club plays in Division 1C of the Northern Amateur Football League (NAFL) and competes in the Irish Cup. Home matches are played at New Harbour Road, close to the village's harbour.

The club fields two teams in the NAFL: the first team in Division 1C and Portavogie Rangers II in Division 3E.

== History ==
Portavogie Rangers were formed in 1961 in the fishing village of Portavogie on the Ards Peninsula. For much of the 1990s and 2000s the club played in the Down Area Winter Football League (DAWFL), winning the Premier Division title nine times between 1992–93 and 2008–09.

The club later joined the Northern Amateur Football League, winning the Division 2B title in 2017–18. In 2021–22, under manager James Cully, the club narrowly missed out on promotion from Division 2A. After a strong start to the following season, Rangers won promotion from Division 2A at the end of the 2022–23 season, moving up to Division 1C and establishing the club at intermediate level.

The first team finished ninth of thirteen in NAFL Division 1C in 2025–26.

== Colours and badge ==
Portavogie Rangers play in blue and red with white accents. The club badge features an anchor, reflecting the village's long association with sea fishing and its working harbour.

== Ground ==
The club plays at New Harbour Road, Portavogie, a short distance from the village harbour.

== Honours ==
=== Northern Amateur Football League ===
- Division 2B: 1
  - 2017–18

=== Down Area Winter Football League ===
- Premier Division: 9
  - 1992–93, 1993–94, 1994–95, 1995–96, 1996–97, 1998–99, 2004–05, 2005–06, 2008–09
- Billy Allen Memorial Shield: 2
  - 1997–98, 2005–06
- Sittlington Cup: 2
  - 1993–94, 1994–95
