= St Luke's F.C. =

Association football club in Northern Ireland

St Luke's
- Full name: St Luke's Football Club
- Founded: 1974
- Ground: Brook Activity Centre, Belfast
- League: NAFL Division 1B

St Luke's Football Club is a Northern Irish, intermediate football club playing in Division 1B of the Northern Amateur Football League. The club is based in Twinbrook, Belfast, and was formed in 1974. The team plays in the Irish Cup.
