= Woodvale F.C. (Northern Ireland) =

Association football club in Northern Ireland

Woodvale
- Full name: Woodvale Football Club
- Founded: 1990
- Ground: Clarendon Sports Facility, Belfast
- League: NAFL Division 1C

Woodvale Football Club is a Northern Irish, intermediate football club playing in Division 1C of the Northern Amateur Football League. The club is based in Belfast, and was formed in 1990 as 99th BB Old Boys. The club plays in the Irish Cup.

== Honours ==
=== Junior honours ===
- Irish Junior Cup: 1
  - 2010-11
- Northern Amateur Football League 2A: 1
  - 2013/14
- Northern Amateur Football League 2c: 1
  - 2009/10
- Cochrane Corry Cup: 1
  - 2013/14
