= St Mary's Youth F.C. =

Association football club in Northern Ireland

St Mary's Youth Club Football Club
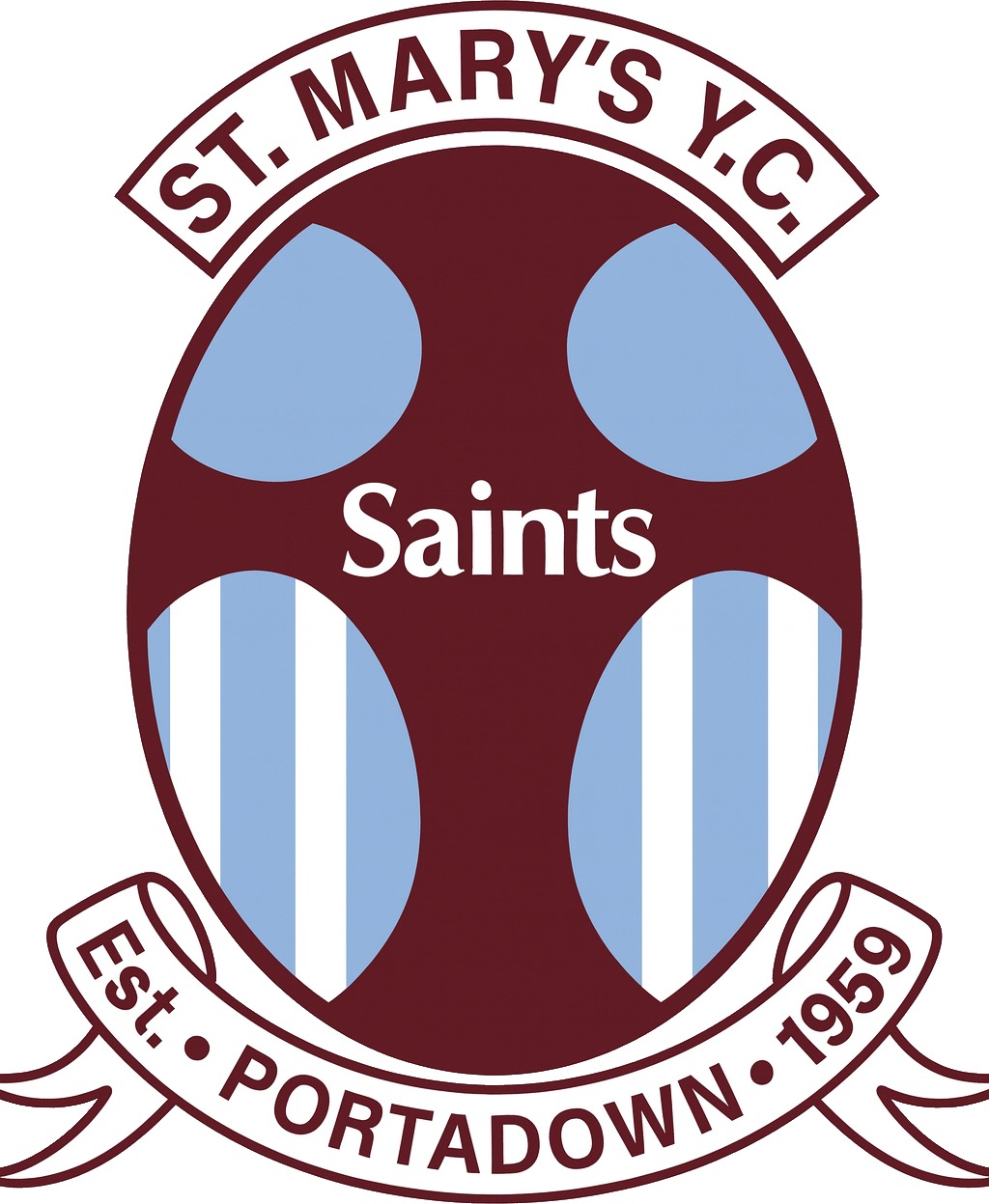
- Full name: St Mary's Youth Football Club
- Nickname: The Saints
- Founded: 1959
- Ground: The Annagh
- Manager: Kevin Murphy
- League: Mid-Ulster Football League Intermediate A

St Mary's Youth Football Club (usually just St Mary's) is a Northern Irish, intermediate football club based in Portadown, County Armagh, playing in Intermediate Division A of the Mid-Ulster Football League. The club was founded in 1959. Club colours are claret and sky blue.

The club, which forms part of the Mid-Ulster Football Association, participates in the Irish Cup.
