= Aquinas F.C. =

Association football club in Northern Ireland

Aquinas
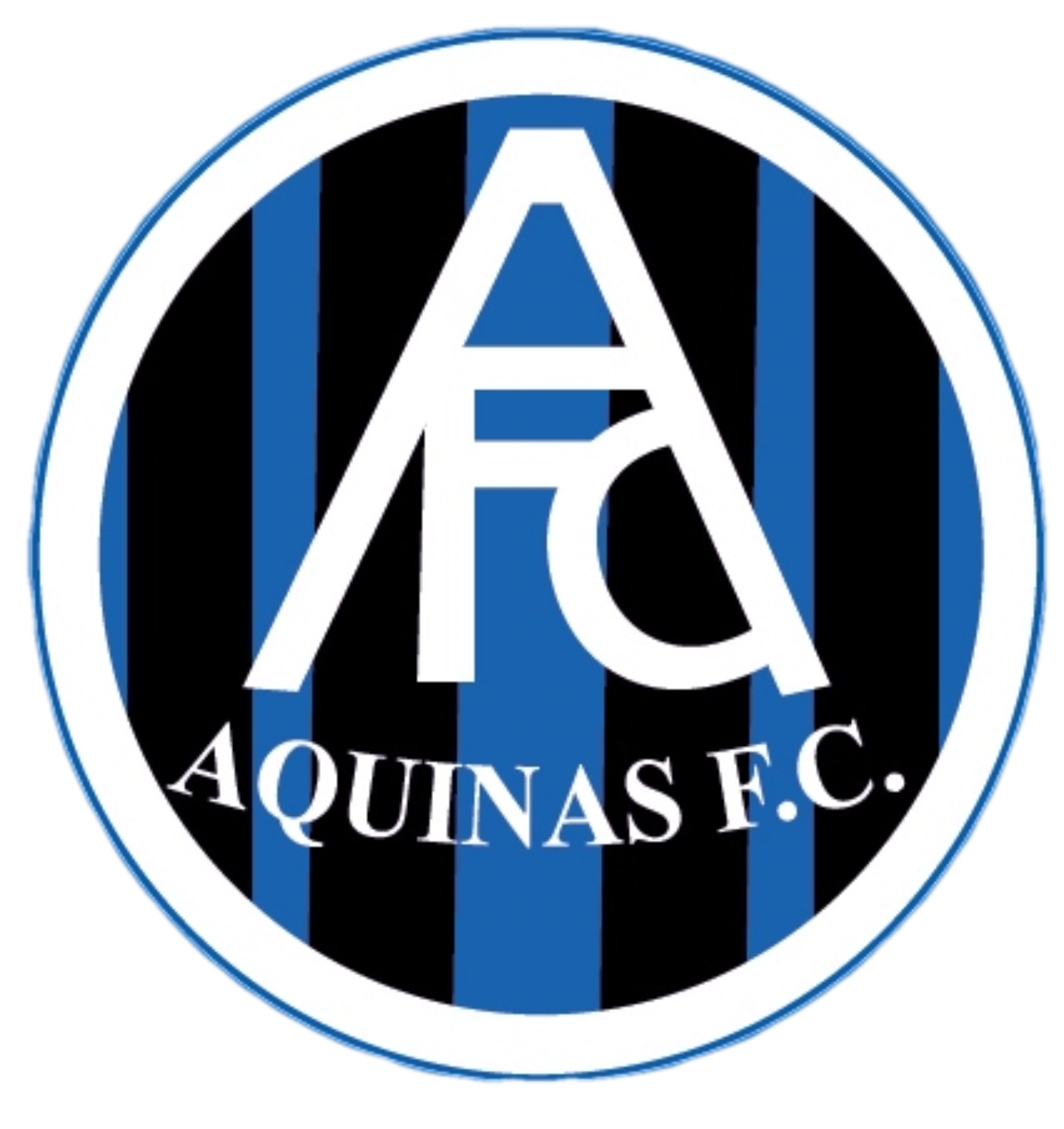
- Full name: Aquinas Football Club
- Founded: 1969
- Ground: Rathmore Grammar School, Belfast
- Chairman: Denis Kelly
- Manager: Liam O'Connor
- Website: http://www.aquinasfc.net
Home colours

Aquinas Football Club is a Northern Irish, intermediate football club from Belfast with senior teams playing in the Northern Amateur Football League. Its home ground is Rathmore Grammar School.

In addition to a Senior team section, Aquinas Football Club provides junior level football to children ranging from age 5 to 18. At present it has a Mini Soccer school and 34 youth teams playing across the FonaCAB, IFA Development, and South Belfast Youth Football leagues, with over 600 members registered with the club. In 2019 Aquinas FC introduced a girls football programme with over 100 members from age 8 to 17. It offers social football for its coaches to enjoy and has an over 35 team for more competitive older member participation.

The club was formed as a youth team in 1969 with a view to keeping children away from the impact of the emerging Northern Ireland Troubles, taking its name from Aquinas Hall on the Malone Road whose hockey pitch was used as the first training venue. This later became the headquarters of the Arts Council of Northern Ireland. The club achieved intermediate status upon promotion to Division 1C of the Amateur League in 2018, consequently qualifying the club to play in the Irish Cup. In 2019, Aquinas FC gained promotion to 1B of Intermediate League

== First Team ==
- NAFL 1B Champions
  - 2024–25
- NAFL 1C Champions
  - 2018–19
- NAFL 2C Champions
  - 2014–15
- BDL First Division Champions
  - 2012–13

== Second Team ==
- NAFL 3B Champions
  - 2021-22
- NAFL 3C Champions
  - 2018–19
- NAFL 3E Champions
  - 2016–17
- NAFL 3F Champions
  - 2014–15

== U21 Team ==
- BDFL U21 Shield Winners
  - 2025–26
- BDFL U21 Cup Winners
  - 2025–26
