= Portaferry Rovers F.C. =

Association football club in Northern Ireland

Portaferry Rovers
- Full name: Portaferry Rovers Football Club
- Founded: 1974
- Ground: Cloughy Road, Portaferry
- League: NAFL Division 1B

Portaferry Rovers is a Northern Irish, intermediate football club playing in Division 1C of the Northern Amateur Football League. The club is based in Portaferry, County Down, and was formed in 1974. The club plays in the Irish Cup.

== Honours ==
=== Junior honours ===
- County Antrim Junior Shield: 2
  - 1999-2000, 2012–13
