= Greenisland F.C. =

Association football club in Northern Ireland

Greenisland
- Full name: Greenisland Football Club
- Nickname: Greenisland
- Founded: 1995
- Ground: Glenkeen Avenue, Greenisland, County Antrim
- Chairman: Stuart McClean
- Manager: Lee McCartney
- League: NAFL Division 1B

Greenisland Football Club, commonly referred to as GFC or simply "Greenisland", is a Northern Irish, intermediate football club playing in Division 1B of the Northern Amateur Football League. The club is based in Greenisland, County Antrim, and was formed in 1995. The club plays in the Irish Cup in their locally-iconic maroon kits.

Greenisland F.C.'s home ground, Glenkeen Avenue, is found in the housing estate Greenisland and is home to a number of facilities. The main pitch is a large floodlight state-of-the-art 3G Astro Pitch, with a 124-seater stand, with disability access. There are also two grass pitches; changing rooms; a smaller floodlight 3G training pitch; a modern and well-equipped clubhouse; Strength & Conditioning suite; and a "wellness portacabin" at Glenkeen Avenue.

Greenisland Football Club have a partnership with Larne F.C., which sees a two-way movement of players between clubs at all levels and shared coach professional development opportunities.

Previously, Greenisland F.C. were partnered with Crusaders F.C..

== Teams ==
At senior level, Greenisland Football Club have 3 teams: Greenisland F.C. First Team, Greenisland F.C. Seconds (playing in the NAFL 3A) and the Greenisland F.C Development Team (formerly Greenisland F.C. Third Team until 2023). Greenisland F.C. also has a Titans team consisting of players over 35 years old.

The club also has a strong setup in Women's football, with the Greenisland Ladies Team established in 2019 playing in the Championship of NI Women’s FA League.

At youth level, Greenisland F.C. has a large number of teams. The club has teams from the under-6 age group up until the under-16 bracket, with many year groups having more than one team. The club also has an introductory section called the Munchkins, where young boys and girls can play before reaching the under-6 level.

Greenisland Bears sees males and females aged between 6 and 16 years old with learning and/or physical disabilities become involved in football.

== Past Players ==
The club has grown astronomically over the past 3 decades, with Greenisland Football Club having over 350 players in 2021. Greenisland F.C. is known for its strong youth development squads, with a number of professional players emerging from the club's youth ranks.

- Jonny Evans
- Corry Evans
- Craig Cathcart
- Michael Smith
- Charlie Allen
- Dale Taylor

== Honours ==
=== Intermediate honours ===
- NAFL 2C: 1
  - 2013–14
- NAFL 1B: 1
  - 2025-26

=== Junior Honours ===
- NAFL 3F: 1*
  - 2016-17
- NAFL 3D: 1*
  - 2018-19
- NAFL 3C: 1*
  - 2019-20
- NAFL 3D: 1*
  - 2022-23
- = Won by Greenisland 2nd team.

=== Cups ===
There are no known senior cup wins for Greenisland F.C. Most recently, the club reached the semi-final of the Steel & Sons Cup in the 2023/24 season.

=== Off-pitch Awards ===
- UEFA Grassroots Award Bronze (2020)

== Community Work ==
Greenisland F.C. is recognised in Northern Ireland for all of its work in the local community.

During the COVID-19 pandemic, club members delivered food packages to community groups and medication from pharmacies to those in need. On top of this, the club also posted challenges and competitions online to keep young players and other children in the community active during the lockdowns.

Greenisland F.C. further helped families during the pandemic by bringing Christmas to people's houses in their "Santa2U" campaign. The club put together a group of volunteer players to dress up as Santa and his elves, delivering presents to young player's front door steps during the festive period.

The players at Greenisland F.C. are also known for their commitment to charity work and bettering the community. First team players Gary Bell and Dee Tumilty ran 4 miles every 4 hours for 2 days in 2021 after teammate Sean Fitzpatrick was diagnosed with Hodgkin's Lymphoma, raising £6,5000 in cash for charity.

Young player, Ben Dickinson, aged 10 at the time, walked from Larne F.C.'s stadium to Old Trafford, Manchester United's Stadium to raise more than 115,000 meals for charity in March 2022.
