= Sirocco Works F.C. =

Association football club in Northern Ireland

Sirocco Works
- Full name: Sirocco Works Football Club
- Nickname: The Roc
- Founded: 1924
- Ground: Dixon Park, Belfast
- League: NAFL Division 1A
- 2018-19: NAFL Division 1A, 5th
Home colours

Sirocco Works Football Club is a Northern Irish intermediate football club playing in Division 1A of the Northern Amateur Football League. Established in 1924, the club is the longest existing club in all the intermediate and junior divisions in Northern Ireland. They were founded originally as a works team for workers of Sirocco Works.

The club currently play matches at Dixon Park in East Belfast. The club also fields a second team in Division 3B of the Amateur League as well as several youth teams.

== History ==
The club is historically linked to the Sirocco Engineering Works located on the east bank of the River Lagan in Belfast. Established in 1881, the company was one of the leading makers of rope in the world before focusing on the tea industry and supplying the local Harland and Wolff shipyards. It was one of the biggest employers in Belfast and from this spawned the Sirocco Works Football Club.

The club joined the Amateur League in 1924 and is the longest-serving member of that league, in unbroken membership ever since. It originally played its home games in Castlereagh, before moving to Warnock Park in the 1950s and the Dixon Park, Belfast. The success of the football club mirrored that of the engineering firm with the majority of the club's trophies won in the 1930s and 1940s. From 1934 up to 1940, the club won six back-to-back league titles and numerous cups. The 1938/39 season saw the club claim four honours including the league title, Border Regiment Cup and Clarence Mayes Cup. The club also won the Steel and Sons Cup, becoming the first amateur side to lift this trophy.

The times following World War II saw the decline of industry in Belfast. Similarly the football club started to struggle in the League. By 1960 the club picked up their last notable honour for the next 20 years, an appearance in the final of the Border Cup. In 1999 came the death knell for the Sirocco Engineering Works as the site was closed to be redeveloped.

Despite the closure of the parent Sirocco engineering plant, board members of the football club decided to continue under the Sirocco name.

The club won Division 1B in 2007–08. Sirocco subsequently won promotion back to 1A in 2016/17 and were runners up in the 2017/18 Clarence Cup Final and 2018/19 Steel & Sons Cup Final.

== Honours ==
=== Intermediate honours ===
- Steel & Sons Cup: 1
  - 1938–39
- Northern Amateur Football League: 8
  - 1926–27, 1934–35, 1935–36, 1936–37, 1937–38, 1938–39, 1939–40, 1947–48
- Division 1B
  - 1985-86
- 2nd Division
  - 1941-42 †, 1942-43 †
- Division 2A
  - 1947-48 †
- Division 3B
  - 1978-79 †
- Division 3C
  - 2010-11 †
- Division 3D
  - 1993-94 †, 2002-03 †
- Clarence Cup: 6
  - 1925–26, 1926–27, 1938–39, 1943–44, 1945–46, 1947–48
- Border Cup: 6
  - 1936–37, 1937–38, 1938–39, 1941–42†, 1944–45, 1945–46

† Won by 2nd XI
