= Suffolk F.C. =

Association football club in Northern Ireland

Suffolk
- Full name: Suffolk Football Club
- Founded: 1987
- Ground: Suffolk Park Belfast
- League: NAFL Division 1C

Suffolk Football Club is a Northern Irish, intermediate football club playing in Division 1C of the Northern Amateur Football League. The club is based in Belfast, and was formed in 1987. The club plays in the Irish Cup.
