= Craigavon City F.C. =

Association football club in Northern Ireland

Craigavon City
- Full name: Craigavon City Football Club
- Founded: 2007
- Ground: Drumgor Road
- League: Mid-Ulster Football League Intermediate B

Craigavon City Football Club is a Northern Irish intermediate football club based in Craigavon, County Armagh, playing in Intermediate Division B of the Mid-Ulster Football League. The club was founded in 2007. Club colours are white and navy.

They are a part of the Mid-Ulster Football Association. The club participates in the Irish Cup.
