= St Oliver Plunkett F.C. =

Association football club in Northern Ireland

St Oliver Plunkett
- Full name: St Oliver Plunkett Football Club
- Nickname(s): Plunkett
- Founded: 1969
- Ground: Lenadoon Park, Belfast
- League: NAFL Division 1A
- 2022/2023: NAFL Division 1B, 1st (Champions)

St Oliver Plunkett Football Club is a Northern Irish, Intermediate football club playing in Division 1A of the Northern Amateur Football League. The club is based in west Belfast, and was formed in 1969. The club plays in the Irish Cup.

== Honours ==
=== Junior honours ===
- Cochrane Corry Cup: 1
  - 1982-83
- County Antrim Junior Shield: 1
  - 2002–03
- NAFL Division 2A: 2
  - 2013-14
  - 2018-19

=== Intermediate Honours ===
- NAFL Division 1B: 1
  - 2022-23
- NAFL Division 1C: 1
  - 2021-22
