= Tullycarnet F.C. =

Association football club in Northern Ireland

Tullycarnet
- Full name: Tullycarnet Football Club
- Ground: Billy Neill Centre Dundonald
- League: NAFL Division 1C

Tullycarnet Football Club is a Northern Irish, intermediate football club playing in Division 1C of the Northern Amateur Football League. The club is based in Tullycarnet, Dundonald, County Down. It joined the Amateur League in 2011. As of 2019, the club was playing in the Irish Cup. Tullycarnet reserves compete in the DAWFL.

== See also ==
- Tullycarnet
