= Desertmartin F.C. =

Association football club in Northern Ireland

Desertmartin
- Full name: Desertmartin Football Club
- Ground: Dromore Park
- League: Ballymena & Provincial Football League
Home colours

Desertmartin Football Club is an intermediate-level football club playing in the Premier division of the Ballymena & Provincial League in Northern Ireland. The club is based in Desertmartin, County Londonderry.

== Honours ==
- Craig Memorial Cup: 1
  - 2025-26
