= Wellington Recreation F.C. =

Association football club in Northern Ireland

Wellington Rec
- Full name: Wellington Recreation Football Club
- Nickname: Welly Rec
- Founded: 1950s
- Ground: Brookvale Park, Larne
- Chairman: Kenny Thompson
- Manager: Glenn Taggart
- League: Ballymena & Provincial Football League, Intermediate Division
- 2021-2022: NAFL Division 1C, 5th

Wellington Recreation Football Club (also known as Wellington Rec) is a Northern Irish, intermediate football club, based in Larne, County Antrim, playing in the Intermediate Division of the Ballymena & Provincial Football League.

The club was formed in the 1950s as A.E.I.: the football team associated with the AEI engineering company's factory in Larne. It joined the Amateur League in 1959. In 1973, the club was renamed G.E.C. after the company of that name took over the AEI factory. Then, in 1993, when GEC closed down its factory in Larne, the club was reformed under its current name and was allowed to retain its status and position in the Amateur League.
