= Association football records and statistics in Northern Ireland =

This page details football records in the Northern Ireland.

== League ==
=== Team records ===
==== Titles ====
- Most top-flight league titles: 57, Linfield
- Most consecutive league titles: 6, joint record:
  - Belfast Celtic (1935–36 to 1947–48, league suspended from 1940 to 1947)
  - Linfield (1981–82 to 1986–87)

==== Top-flight Appearances ====
- Most seasons in the top flight: 121, joint record:
  - Cliftonville (1890–present)
  - Glentoran (1890–present)
  - Linfield (1890–present)

=== Overall top flight League Table (since 2008) ===
The overall top flight League table is a cumulative record of all match results, points and goals of every team that has played in the 14 completed seasons of the top flight in its current format - namely the IFA/NIFL Premiership since its inception in the 2008–09 season. Teams in bold are part of the 2022–23 season. Numbers in bold are the record numbers in each column.

As of the end of the 2021–22 season. All seasons were played over 38 games, except the 2019–20 season which was played over 31 games due to the COVID-19 pandemic in Northern Ireland.

Rank	Club	Seasons completed	Matches played	Won	Drawn	Lost	Goals scored	Goals conceded	Goal difference	Total points	Titles	Runners-up	Avg Pts/season	Best finish
**1**	**Linfield**	**14**	**525**	**330**	101	94	**1,071**	480	**+591**	**1,091**	**8**	**4**	**77.93**	**1st**
2	**Crusaders**	**14**	**525**	300	106	119	1,027	602	+425	1,006	3	3	71.86	**1st**
3	**Cliftonville**	**14**	**525**	275	107	143	937	639	+298	932	2	2	66.57	**1st**
4	**Glentoran**	**14**	**525**	238	127	160	829	634	+195	841	1	0	60.07	**1st**
5	**Coleraine**	**14**	**525**	233	**129**	163	797	652	+145	828	0	3	59.14	2nd
6	**Glenavon**	**14**	**525**	204	121	200	895	845	+50	733	0	0	52.36	3rd
7	**Ballymena United**	**14**	**525**	195	105	225	778	858	–80	690	0	1	49.29	2nd
8	**Dungannon Swifts**	**14**	**525**	148	119	**258**	634	**930**	–296	563	0	0	40.21	5th
9	**Portadown**	10	380	135	74	171	538	616	–78	479	0	1	47.90	2nd
10	Warrenpoint Town	8	297	63	55	179	340	624	–284	244	0	0	30.50	10th
11	Ballinamallard United	6	228	59	46	123	246	404	–158	223	0	0	37.17	5th
12	**Carrick Rangers**	7	259	50	50	159	265	522	–257	200	0	0	28.57	8th
13	Lisburn Distillery	5	190	52	38	100	233	357	–124	194	0	0	38.80	4th
14	**Larne**	3	107	51	29	27	184	109	+75	182	0	0	60.67	1st
15	Institute	5	183	38	45	100	192	345	–153	159	0	0	31.80	7th
16	Ards	4	152	37	27	88	178	290	–112	138	0	0	34.50	8th
17	Newry City	3	114	27	31	56	122	185	–63	112	0	0	37.33	8th
18	Donegal Celtic	3	114	26	22	66	131	249	–118	100	0	0	33.33	8th
19	Bangor	1	38	9	9	20	42	67	–25	36	0	0	36.00	11th
20	**Newry City AFC**	1	38	6	5	27	31	68	–37	23	0	0	23.00	12th

League or status:

2022–23 NIFL Premiership
2022–23 NIFL Championship
2022–23 NIFL Premier Intermediate League
Non-League
Dissolved

== Irish Cup ==
- Most wins: 44, Linfield
- Most consecutive wins: 4, Glentoran (1985, 1986, 1987 & 1988)
- Most appearances in a final: 64, Linfield
- Most consecutive appearances in a final: 5, Linfield (1891, 1892, 1893, 1894 & 1895)
- Most defeats in a final: 21, Linfield
- Most consecutive defeats in a final: 3, Linfield (1975, 1976 & 1977)
- Biggest win in a final: Linfield 10–1 Bohemians (1895)
- Longest gap between wins in a final: 70 years, Cliftonville (1909 and 1979)
- Longest gap between appearances in a final: 55 years, Bangor (1938 and 1993)
- Most appearances in a final without winning: 6, Larne (1928, 1935, 1987, 1989, 2005 & 2021)
- Most common pair of finalists: Glentoran v Linfield – 15 times (1899, 1913, 1914, 1916, 1919, 1923, 1932, 1942, 1945, 1966, 1973, 1983, 1985, 2001 & 2006)

== League Cup ==
- Most wins: 10, Linfield
- Most consecutive wins: 4, Cliftonville (2012–13, 2013–14, 2014–15 & 2015–16)
- Most final appearances: 12, joint record:
  - Glentoran
  - Linfield
- Most consecutive final appearances: 4, Cliftonville (2012–13, 2013–14, 2014–15 & 2015–16)
- Most final defeats: 6, Crusaders (1986–87, 1995–96, 2007–08, 2012–13, 2013–14 & 2019–20)
- Most consecutive final defeats: 3, Glentoran (1996–97, 1997–98 & 1998–99)
- Biggest final winning margin: 4–0, joint record:
  - Linfield 4–0 Coleraine (1999–2000)
  - Cliftonville 4–0 Crusaders (2012–13)
- Longest gap between wins: 15 years, Crusaders (1996–97 and 2011–12)
- Longest gap between final appearances: 21 years, Ards (1994–95 and 2015–16)
- Most final appearances without winning: 2, joint record:
  - Larne (1991–92 & 2003–04)
  - Newry City (1989–90 and 2008–09)
- Most common final: Glentoran v Linfield (7 times)

== Total titles won ==
As of 3 July 2026

Team	Domestic							Ireland	Total (Note: Does not includes Regional cups)
Team	Irish League	Irish Cup	League Cup	Super Cup	Top Four Cup	Regional cups (Note: County Antrim Shield; Mid-Ulster Cup; North West Cup)	Northern Ireland cups (Note: Gold Cup; Ulster Cup; City Cup; Floodlit Cup; Carlsberg Cup; Belfast Charity Cup; Alhambra Cup)	All-Ireland cups (Note: Setanta Sports Cup; Dublin and Belfast Inter-City Cup; North-South Cup; Blaxnit Cup; Texaco Cup; Tyler Cup; Irish News Cup)	Total
Linfield	57	44	13	4	2	44	102	4	226
Glentoran	23	23	7	2	-	28	52	2	109
Belfast Celtic	14	8	-	-	-	8	31	1	54
Cliftonville	5	9	7	2	-	11	15	-	38
Lisburn Distillery	6	12	1	-	-	14	17	1	37
Glenavon	3	7	1	2	-	29	14	1	28
Coleraine	1	7	2	-	1	23	14	3	28
Portadown	4	3	2	1	-	24	13	1	24
Crusaders	7	6	2	2	-	8	6	1	24
Ballymena United	-	5	1	-	-	6	5	-	11
Ards	1	4	1	-	-	3	3	1	10
Derry City	1	3	-	-	1	18	4	-	9
Larne	3	-	-	2	-	4	2	-	7
Bangor	-	1	1	1	-	3	4	-	7
Queen's Island [II]	1	1	-	-	-	1	3	-	5
Shelbourne	-	3	-	-	-	-	2	-	5
Dungannon Swifts	-	1	1	1	-	11	1	-	4
Omagh Town	-	-	-	-	-	6	1	1	2
Carrick Rangers	-	1	-	-	-	2	-	-	1
Black Watch	-	-	-	-	-	1	1	-	1
Ballymena	-	1	-	-	-	-	-	-	1
Bohemians	-	1	-	-	-	-	-	-	1
Dundela	-	1	-	-	-	-	-	-	1
Gordon Highlanders	-	1	-	-	-	-	-	-	1
Moyola Park	-	1	-	-	-	-	-	-	1
Queen's Island [I]	-	1	-	-	-	-	-	-	1
Ulster	-	1	-	-	-	-	-	-	1
Willowfield	-	1	-	-	-	-	-	-	1
Ballyclare Comrades	-	-	-	-	-	-	1	-	1
North Staffordshire Regiment	-	-	-	-	-	-	1	-	1
Oldpark	-	-	-	-	-	-	1	-	1
Newry City [I]	-	-	-	-	-	16	-	-	-
Derry Celtic	-	-	-	-	-	9	-	-	-
Institute	-	-	-	-	-	8	-	-	-
Banbridge Town	-	-	-	-	-	5	-	-	-
Limavady	-	-	-	-	-	5	-	-	-
Limavady United	-	-	-	-	-	5	-	-	-
Tandragee Rovers	-	-	-	-	-	5	-	-	-
Celtic Wanderers	-	-	-	-	-	4	-	-	-
Donacloney	-	-	-	-	-	4	-	-	-
Derry Hibernians	-	-	-	-	-	3	-	-	-
Loughgall	-	-	-	-	-	3	-	-	-
Lurgan Celtic (1903)	-	-	-	-	-	3	-	-	-
Seapatrick	-	-	-	-	-	3	-	-	-
Tobermore United	-	-	-	-	-	3	-	-	-
Ballinamallard United	-	-	-	-	-	2	-	-	-
Dergview	-	-	-	-	-	2	-	-	-
Milford	-	-	-	-	-	2	-	-	-
St Columb's Court	-	-	-	-	-	2	-	-	-
Warrenpoint Town	-	-	-	-	-	2	-	-	-
15th The King's Hussars	-	-	-	-	-	1	-	-	-
Annagh United	-	-	-	-	-	1	-	-	-
Armagh City	-	-	-	-	-	1	-	-	-
Banford	-	-	-	-	-	1	-	-	-
Blane's	-	-	-	-	-	1	-	-	-
Bright Stars	-	-	-	-	-	1	-	-	-
Dromore Athletic	-	-	-	-	-	1	-	-	-
Duke of Cornwall's Light Infantry	-	-	-	-	-	1	-	-	-
East Lancashire Regiment	-	-	-	-	-	1	-	-	-
Gilford Crusaders	-	-	-	-	-	1	-	-	-
Lurgan Rangers	-	-	-	-	-	1	-	-	-
Milltown Wanderers	-	-	-	-	-	1	-	-	-
Newbuildings United	-	-	-	-	-	1	-	-	-
New Century	-	-	-	-	-	1	-	-	-
Newry City [II]	-	-	-	-	-	1	-	-	-
Sunnyside	-	-	-	-	-	1	-	-	-
Strabane Athletic	-	-	-	-	-	1	-	-	-

== See also ==
- List of football clubs by competitive honours won
