= 1992–93 Irish Cup =

Tournament details
- Country: Northern Ireland
- Teams: 101

Final positions
- Champions: Bangor (1st win)
- Runners-up: Ards

Tournament statistics
- Matches played: 117
- Goals scored: 466 (3.98 per match)

The 1992–93 Irish Cup was the 113th edition of the Irish Cup, Northern Ireland's premier football knock-out cup competition. It concluded on 11 May 1993.

Bangor were appearing in their first final since 1938 and won for the first time with a 1–0 victory over Ards in the second replay. The first two matches has ended at 1–1 after extra time. Subsequently, it was decided that there would only be one final replay, in which penalties would be used to determine the winner if necessary. Eventually the rules were changed to remove replays altogether, with penalties being used if necessary after extra time in the first match.

== Results ==
=== First round ===
The following teams were given byes into the second round: 1st Shankill NISC, Bangor Amateurs, Cookstown Royals, Donard Hospital, East Belfast, Islandmagee, Killyleagh Youth, Larne Tech Old Boys, Queen's University, Rathfriland Rangers and Sirocco Works.

Team 1	Score	Team 2
1st Bangor Old Boys	3–1	Seapatrick
1st Liverpool	6–0	Wellington Recreation
Abbey Villa	7–2	Ballynahinch United
Annagh United	3–2	Dungiven United
Annalong Swifts	4–4	Connor
Ards Rangers	5–2	Orangefield Old Boys
Armagh City	2–2	AFC
Armoy United	1–3	Harland & Wolff Welders
Bridgend United	1–2	Oxford United Stars
Comber Recreation	4–1	Dervock United
Cullybackey	1–4	Downshire Young Men
Dromore Amateurs	2–3	Ballymacash Rangers
Glebe Rangers	3–2	Dromara Village
Hanover	0–2	Shorts
Harland & Wolff Sports	7–0	Star of the Sea
Institute	0–0	Northern Telecom
Killymoon Rangers	0–1	Magherafelt Sky Blues
Portglenone	2–5	Macosquin
Portstewart	0–0	Saintfield United
Richhill	1–5	Barn United
Roe Valley	2–1	Bessbrook United
Scarva Rangers	2–3	Drummond United
Southend United	4–5	ECC
UUC	1–1	Tandragee Rovers
UUJ	0–0	Civil Service

==== Replays ====
Team 1	Score	Team 2
AFC	4–5	Armagh City
Civil Service	5–1	UUJ
Connor	2–1	Annalong Swifts
Northern Telecom	2–0	Institute
Saintfield United	8–0	Portstewart
Tandragee Rovers	1–1 (a.e.t.) (4–5 p)	UUC

=== Second round ===
Team 1	Score	Team 2
1st Shankill NISC	2–3	Killyleagh Youth
Abbey Villa	4–1	Larne Tech Old Boys
Armagh City	6–4	Cookstown Royals
Bangor Amateurs	2–4	Macosquin
Barn United	5–3	Rathfriland Rangers
Civil Service	0–2	1st Bangor Old Boys
Comber Recreation	1–0	Dervock United
Donard Hospital	3–0	Ballymacash Rangers
Drummond United	2–0	Downshire Young Men
ECC	3–2	East Belfast
Glebe Rangers	1–3	Ards Rangers
Harland & Wolff Welders	2–1	Oxford United Stars
Islandmagee	4–2	Queen's University
Northern Telecom	0–2	Magherafelt Sky Blues
Roe Valley	2–0	Annagh United
Saintfield United	3–3	Connor
Shorts	1–6	Harland & Wolff Sports
Sirocco Works	4–1	1st Liverpool

==== Replay ====
Team 1	Score	Team 2
Connor	6–3	Saintfield United

=== Third round ===
Team 1	Score	Team 2
Abbey Villa	1–3	Comber Recreation
Ards Rangers	2–0	Connor
Donard Hospital	4–3	Magherafelt Sky Blues
ECC	0–0	Harland & Wolff Welders
Islandmagee	1–0	Barn United
Killyleagh Youth	8–4	Harland & Wolff Sport
Macosquin	3–0	Drummond United
Roe Valley	4–0	1st Bangor Old Boys
Sirocco Works	1–2	Armagh City

==== Replays ====
Team 1	Score	Team 2
Harland & Wolff Welders	5–0	ECC

=== Fourth round ===
Team 1	Score	Team 2
Ballinamallard United	4–1	FC Enkalon
Ballymoney United	5–6	Armagh City
Banbridge Town	2–1	Ards Rangers
British Telecom	1–0	Tobermore United
Chimney Corner	1–1	Comber Recreation
Coagh United	2–0	Macosquin
Crumlin United	0–2	Limavady United
Drumaness Mills	2–1	Islandmagee
Dundela	3–1	Moyola Park
Dungannon Swifts	1–1	Cookstown United
Dunmurry Recreation	1–1	Donegal Celtic
Harland & Wolff Welders	6–1	Donard Hospital
Kilmore Recreation	0–0	Roe Valley
Loughgall	4–1	Crewe United
Park	1–2	Brantwood
RUC	2–1	Killyleagh Youth

==== Replays ====
Team 1	Score	Team 2
Chimney Corner	3–2	Comber Recreation
Cookstown United	1–2	Dungannon Swifts
Donegal Celtic	3–1	Dunmurry Recreation
Kilmore Recreation	1–5	Roe Valley

=== Fifth round ===
Team 1	Score	Team 2
Ards	3–0	Loughgall
Ballyclare Comrades	2–0	Banbridge Town
Brantwood	2–0	Donegal Celtic
Carrick Rangers	2–4	Bangor
Chimney Corner	0–1	Drumaness Mills
Cliftonville	1–0	Harland & Wolff Welders
Coagh United	2–1	Dungannon Swifts
Crusaders	2–2	Larne
Distillery	6–0	British Telecom
Glenavon	0–3	Ballymena United
Limavady United	3–0	Roe Valley
Linfield	6–1	Coleraine
Newry Town	2–2	Dundela
Omagh Town	3–0	Ballinamallard United
Portadown	0–0	Glentoran
RUC	2–3	Armagh City

==== Replays ====
Team 1	Score	Team 2
Dundela	1–1 (a.e.t.) (5–3 p)	Newry Town
Larne	1–0	Crusaders
Glentoran	1–0	Portadown

=== Sixth round ===
Team 1	Score	Team 2
Ballyclare Comrades	1–1	Distillery
Bangor	2–0	Armagh City
Brantwood	0–1	Glentoran
Cliftonville	2–0	Ballymena United
Coagh United	1–8	Larne
Drumaness Mills	0–4	Ards
Dundela	3–2	Limavady United
Omagh Town	1–1	Linfield

==== Replays ====
Team 1	Score	Team 2
Distillery	2–1	Ballyclare Comrades
Linfield	3–0	Omagh Town

=== Quarter-finals ===
Team 1	Score	Team 2
Distillery	0–0	Ards
Dundela	1–2	Glentoran
Larne	1–1	Cliftonville
Linfield	1–2	Bangor

==== Replays ====
Team 1	Score	Team 2
Ards	4–1	Distillery
Cliftonville	2–0	Larne

=== Semi-finals ===
Team 1	Score	Team 2
Ards	3–2	Cliftonville
Bangor	3–1	Glentoran

=== Final ===
1 May 1993

Bangor	1 – 1 (a.e.t.)	Ards
Glendinning 88'	Report	McCourt 86'

Windsor Park, Belfast

==== Replay ====
8 May 1993

Bangor	1 – 1 (a.e.t.)	Ards
Glendinning 35'	Report	Erskine 2'

Windsor Park, Belfast

==== Second replay ====
11 May 1993

Bangor	1 – 0	Ards
Byrne 89'	Report

Windsor Park, Belfast
