= 1998–99 Irish Cup =

Tournament details
- Country: Northern Ireland
- Teams: 84

Final positions
- Champions: Portadown (2nd win)

Tournament statistics
- Matches played: 101
- Goals scored: 351 (3.48 per match)

The 1998–99 Irish Cup was the 119th edition of the Irish Cup, Northern Ireland's premier football knock-out cup competition. The last match was played on 20 April 1999. The final did not take place this year, for only the third time in the competition's history.

Glentoran were the defending champions after winning their 17th Irish Cup last season, with a 1–0 win over Glenavon in the 1998 final. This season they reached the sixth round, where they were defeated 2–1 by Cliftonville.

Portadown won the cup for the second time, after Cliftonville were disqualified from the competition for fielding an ineligible player in the semi-final replay against Linfield. Linfield were not permitted to replace Cliftonville in the final, so Portadown were awarded the cup without the final being played.

== Results ==
The following teams were given byes into the first round: 1st Bangor Old Boys, Ballynahinch United, Bangor Amateurs, Civil Service, Dromara Village, Dromore Amateurs, Drummond United, Hanover, Harland & Wolff Sports, Killymoon Rangers, Larne Tech Old Boys, Laurelvale, Magherafelt Sky Blues, Portstewart, Queen's University, Rathfriland Rangers, Seapatrick, Sirocco Works, UUJ and Wellington Recreation.

=== Preliminary round ===
Team 1	Score	Team 2
Abbey Villa	2–0	Ballymacash Rangers
Ballycastle United	1–2	Downshire Young Men
Barn United	2–0	Donard Hospital
Bessbrook United	3–1	Comber Recreation
Bridge End United	1–4	Killyleagh Youth
East Belfast	3–2	Shorts
Islandmagee	1–3	Glebe Rangers
Lurgan Celtic	4–0	Annagh United
Malachians	1–1	Draperstown Celtic
UUC	1–1	Tandragee Rovers
Warrenpoint Town	2–1	Cullybackey

==== Replays ====
Team 1	Score	Team 2
Draperstown Celtic	2–0	Malachians
Tandragee Rovers	1–0	UUC

=== First round ===
Team 1	Score	Team 2
Abbey Villa	2–2	Rathfriland Rangers
Bangor Amateurs	2–3	Magherafelt Sky Blues
Barn United	0–0	Albert Foundry
Bessbrook United	0–6	Killyleagh Youth
Downshire Young Men	2–1	Portstewart
Draperstown Celtic	1–3	Glebe Rangers
Drummond United	3–0	Civil Service
Dromara Village	3–0	Sirocco Works
Dromore Amateurs	0–3	Ballynahinch United
Hanover	1–1	Killymoon Rangers
Larne Tech Old Boys	6–0	1st Bangor Old Boys
Laurelvale	1–1	Warrenpoint Town
Lurgan Celtic	6–2	East Belfast
Seapatrick	3–2	Queen's University
UUJ	1–1	Harland & Wolff Sports
Wellington Recreation	3–1	Tandragee Rovers

==== Replays ====
Team 1	Score	Team 2
Albert Foundry	0–3	Barn United
Harland & Wolff Sports	6–1	UUJ
Killymoon Rangers	2–1	Hanover
Rathfriland Rangers	2–1	Abbey Villa
Warrenpoint Town	5–4	Laurelvale

=== Second round ===
Team 1	Score	Team 2
Barn United	2–4	Downshire Young Men
Draperstown Celtic	2–2	Dromara Village
Killyleagh Youth	7–0	Ballynahinch United
Killymoon Rangers	0–6	Drummond United
Lurgan Celtic	6–0	Seapatrick
Magherafelt Sky Blues	1–3	Warrenpoint Town
Rathfriland Rangers	2–3	Harland & Wolff Sports
Wellington Recreation	2–2	Larne Tech Old Boys

==== Replays ====
Team 1	Score	Team 2
Albert Foundry	0–3	Barn United
Dromara Village	3–1	Draperstown Celtic
Larne Tech Old Boys	2–1	Wellington Recreation

=== Third round ===
Team 1	Score	Team 2
Dromara Village	2–1	Larne Tech Old Boys
Drummond United	2–2	Killyleagh Youth
Harland & Wolff Sports	3–3	Downshire Young Men
Warrenpoint Town	0–1	Lurgan Celtic

==== Replays ====
Team 1	Score	Team 2
Downshire Young Men	3–1	Harland & Wolff Sports
Killyleagh Youth	0–5	Drummond United

=== Fourth round ===
Team 1	Score	Team 2
Armagh City	0–1	Ards Rangers
Ballinamallard United	1–4	Lurgan Celtic
Brantwood	3–2	RUC
Chimney Corner	0–0	Cookstown United
Crewe United	2–3	Downshire Young Men
Crumlin United	4–1	Coagh United
Donegal Celtic	0–2	Institute
Drumaness Mills	3–2	Dromara Village
Dundela	3–0	Dunmurry Recreation
FC Enkalon	1–3	Drummond United
Harland & Wolff Welders	2–1	Moyola Park
Kilmore Recreation	0–1	Ballymoney United
Tobermore United	2–1	Park

==== Replay ====
Team 1	Score	Team 2
Cookstown United	2–0	Coagh United

=== Fifth round ===
Team 1	Score	Team 2
Ards	1–0	Ards Rangers
Ballymena United	3–1	Larne
Bangor	0–3	Glenavon
Brantwood	3–1	Drummond United
Carrick Rangers	2–2	Dungannon Swifts
Cliftonville	6–1	Crewe United
Coleraine	1–1	Limavady United
Crusaders	1–1	Newry Town
Distillery	4–0	Harland & Wolff Welders
Drumaness Mills	0–2	Lurgan Celtic
Glentoran	3–0	Tobermore United
Institute	0–1	Chimney Corner
Linfield	6–0	Crumlin United
Loughgall	2–1	Dundela
Omagh Town	1–2	Ballyclare Comrades
Portadown	1–0	Ballymoney United

==== Replays ====
Team 1	Score	Team 2
Dungannon Swifts	3–4	Carrick Rangers
Limavady United	0–1	Coleraine
Newry Town	2–3	Crusaders

=== Sixth round ===
Team 1	Score	Team 2
Ballymena United	3–0	Ballyclare Comrades
Carrick Rangers	2–0	Ards
Cliftonville	2–1	Glentoran
Coleraine	2–1	Loughgall
Distillery	5–0	Brantwood
Glenavon	3–0	Crusaders
Linfield	3–1	Chimney Corner
Lurgan Celtic	0–3	Portadown

=== Quarter-finals ===
Team 1	Score	Team 2
Carrick Rangers	1–2	Cliftonville
Coleraine	1–2	Portadown
Distillery	1–1	Ballymena United
Linfield	0–0	Glenavon

==== Replays ====
Team 1	Score	Team 2
Ballymena United	2–1 (a.e.t.)	Distillery
Glenavon	1–2	Linfield

=== Semi-finals ===
Team 1	Score	Team 2
Ballymena United	0–2	Portadown
Cliftonville	1–1	Linfield

==== Replay ====
Team 1	Score	Team 2
Linfield	0–1	Cliftonville

=== Final ===
On 29 April 1999, Cliftonville were disqualified from the competition for fielding an ineligible player in the semi-final replay against Linfield. The player in question had played for a junior club in an earlier round and was therefore ineligible. However, Linfield's protest came more than 48 hours after the tie (the usual deadline for protests), and as a result the IFA did not allow them to take Cliftonville's place in the final. Portadown were therefore awarded the cup without the final taking place.
