= 1999–2000 Irish Cup =

Tournament details
- Country: Northern Ireland
- Teams: 84

Final positions
- Champions: Glentoran (18th win)
- Runners-up: Portadown

Tournament statistics
- Matches played: 99
- Goals scored: 386 (3.9 per match)

The 1999–2000 Irish Cup was the 120th edition of the Irish Cup, Northern Ireland's premier football knock-out cup competition. It concluded on 6 May 2000 with the final.

Portadown were the defending champions, winning their 2nd Irish Cup last season after Cliftonville were disqualified from the 1999 final. This season Portadown reached the final again, but were defeated 1–0 by Glentoran, who won the cup for the 18th time.

== Results ==
=== Preliminary round ===
Team 1	Score	Team 2
1st Bangor Old Boys	1–2	UUJ
Abbey Villa	6–0	Banbridge AFC
AFC Craigavon	1–3	Tandragee Rovers
Albert Foundry	3–3	Downshire Young Men
Ballycastle United	2–5	East Belfast
Ballymacash Rangers	6–0	Seapatrick
Ballynanhinch United	2–4	Laurelvale
Bridge End United	0–2	Dungiven Celtic
Comber Recreation	4–0	Bangor Amateurs
Harland & Wolff Sports	2–2	Barn United
Islandmagee	5–2	Oxford United Stars
Larne Tech Old Boys	1–2	Malachians
Magherafelt Sky Blues	0–5	Bessbrook United
Northern Telecom	2–0	Sirocco Works
Queen's University	2–2	Warrenpoint Town
Richhill	0–3	Draperstown Celtic
Roe Valley	2–4	Saintfield United
Shorts	1–1	Donard Hospital
UUC	3–1	Wellington Recreation

==== Replays ====
Team 1	Score	Team 2
Barn United	5–1	Harland & Wolff Sports
Donard Hospital	0–3	Shorts
Downshire Young Men	0–1	Albert Foundry
Warrenpoint Town	1–2	Queen's University

=== First round ===
Team 1	Score	Team 2
Albert Foundry	1–5	Saintfield United
Ballymacash Rangers	2–2	Queen's University
Barn United	1–2	Draperstown Celtic
Bessbrook United	2–1	UUJ
Dungiven Celtic	0–4	East Belfast
Islandmagee	1–6	Comber Recreation
Laurelvale	4–1	Tandragee Rovers
Malachians	0–0	UUC
Northern Telecom	1–1	Shorts

==== Replays ====
Team 1	Score	Team 2
Queen's University	1–2	Ballymacash Rangers
Short Brothers	0–6	Northern Telecom
UUC	3–4	Malachians

=== Second round ===
Team 1	Score	Team 2
East Belfast	3–0	Draperstown Celtic
Northern Telecom	3–3	Saintfield United

==== Replay ====
Team 1	Score	Team 2
Saintfield United	2–3	Northern Telecom

=== Third round ===
Team 1	Score	Team 2
Ballymacash Rangers	1–5	Comber Recreation
East Belfast	5–0	Northern Telecom
Laurelvale	0–4	Bessbrook United
Malachians	4–0	Abbey Villa

=== Fourth round ===
Team 1	Score	Team 2
Ards Rangers	3–0	Drumaness Mills
Banbridge AFC	4–1	Kilmore Recreation
Crumlin United	3–3	Harland & Wolff Welders
Donegal Celtic	1–1	Coagh United
Dundela	1–3	Ballinamallard United
East Belfast	7–0	Dromara Village
Killyleagh Youth	2–0	VIP Sport
Portstewart	0–0	Crewe United

==== Replays ====
Team 1	Score	Team 2
Donegal Celtic	2–1 (a.e.t.)	Coagh United
Crewe United	4–1	Portstewart
Harland & Wolff Welders	3–2	Crumlin United

=== Fourth round (A) ===
Team 1	Score	Team 2
Ards Rangers	1–3	Portstewart
Ballinamallard United	4–1	Malachians
Ballymoney United	2–3	Comber Recreation
Banbridge Town	1–0	Harland & Wolff Welders
Chimney Corner	2–7	Bessbrook United
Cookstown United	1–2	RUC
Donegal Celtic	1–3	Brantwood
Dunmurry Recreation	1–5	East Belfast
FC Enkalon	3–2	Moyola Park
Killyleagh Youth	5–1	Lurgan Celtic

=== Fifth round ===
Team 1	Score	Team 2
Ballinamallard United	1–2	Killyleagh Youth
Banbridge Town	3–2	East Belfast
Bangor	2–0	Carrick Rangers
Brantwood	2–3	Bessbrook United
Cliftonville	3–0	Portstewart
Coleraine	7–0	Comber Recreation
Dungannon Swifts	0–0	Ards
Glenavon	0–1	Newry Town
Glentoran	3–0	Crusaders
Institute	1–2	RUC
Larne	1–5	Portadown
Limavady United	0–2	Armagh City
Linfield	3–1	FC Enkalon
Lisburn Distillery	2–1	Omagh Town
Loughgall	0–1	Ballymena United
Tobermore United	4–2	Ballyclare Comrades

==== Replay ====
Team 1	Score	Team 2
Ards	0–1 (a.e.t.)	Dungannon Swifts

=== Sixth round ===
Team 1	Score	Team 2
Armagh City	2–2	Glentoran
Ballymena United	2–1	Bessbrook United
Bangor	3–3	Coleraine
Dungannon Swifts	4–0	Tobermore United
Killyleagh Youth	0–1	Linfield
Lisburn Distillery	3–0	RUC
Newry Town	3–0	Banbridge Town
Portadown	1–0	Cliftonville

==== Replays ====
Team 1	Score	Team 2
Coleraine	8–3	Bangor
Glentoran	4–0	Armagh City

=== Quarter-finals ===
Team 1	Score	Team 2
Coleraine	1–0	Ballymena United
Linfield	2–2	Dungannon Swifts
Lisburn Distillery	0–2	Portadown
Newry Town	1–3	Glentoran

==== Replay ====
Team 1	Score	Team 2
Dungannon Swifts	1–2 (a.e.t.)	Linfield

=== Semi-finals ===
Team 1	Score	Team 2
Coleraine	0–0	Portadown
Linfield	2–3	Glentoran

==== Replay ====
Team 1	Score	Team 2
Portadown	1–0	Coleraine

=== Final ===
6 May 2000

Glentoran	1 – 0	Portadown
Gilzean 59'	Report

Windsor Park, Belfast
Attendance: 8,355
