= 1995–96 Irish Cup =

Tournament details
- Country: Northern Ireland
- Teams: 91

Final positions
- Champions: Glentoran (16th win)
- Runners-up: Glenavon

Tournament statistics
- Matches played: 107
- Goals scored: 404 (3.78 per match)

The 1995–96 Irish Cup was the 116th edition of the Irish Cup, Northern Ireland's premier football knock-out cup competition. It concluded on 4 May 1996 with the final.

Linfield were the defending champions after winning their 35th Irish Cup last season, with a 3–1 win over Carrick Rangers in the 1995 final. This season they reached the quarter-finals, but lost to 2–0 to Crusaders. Glentoran were the eventual cup winners, defeating Glenavon 1–0 in the final to win the cup for the 16th time.

== Results ==
=== First round ===
The following teams were given byes into the second round: Ards Rangers, Bessbrook United, Cullybackey, Dungiven Celtic, Glebe Rangers, Larne Tech Old Boys, Laurelvale, Northern Telecom, Orangefield Old Boys, Portglenone, Saintfield United, Southend United and UUC.

Team 1	Score	Team 2
1st Bangor Old Boys	2–2	Abbey Villa
1st Liverpool	4–1	Ballymacash Rangers
Armoy United	2–6	East Belfast
Ballynahinch United	3–0	Rathfriland Rangers
Bangor Amateurs	2–3	Shorts
Bridgend United	1–3	1st Shankill NISC
Downshire Young Men	2–0	Cookstown Royals
Dromara Village	0–0	Annagh United
Drummond United	0–1	Dromore Amateurs
Harland & Wolff Welders	5–2	Civil Service
Islandmagee	3–0	AFC Craigavon
Killymoon Rangers	1–3	Wellington Recreation
Magherafelt Sky Blues	0–1	Portstewart
Malachians	4–0	Comber Recreation
Queen's University	2–2	Hanover
Roe Valley	2–0	Killyleagh Youth
Seapatrick	2–2	Barn United
Sirocco Works	w/o	Richhill
Tandragee Rovers	4–2	Donard Hospital

==== Replays ====
Team 1	Score	Team 2
Abbey Villa	0–1	1st Bangor Old Boys
Annagh United	2–0	Dromara Village
Barn United	3–4	Seapatrick
Hanover	3–1	Queen's University

=== Second round ===
Team 1	Score	Team 2
Annagh United	3–2	Portglenone
Ards Rangers	1–1	Glebe Rangers
Ballynahinch United	0–4	1st Liverpool
Cullybackey	5–4	Sirocco Works
East Belfast	1–1	Northern Telecom
Harland & Wolff Welders	5–2	Hanover
Islandmagee	2–2	Dungiven Celtic
Larne Tech Old Boys	2–0	1st Shankill NISC
Malachians	2–2	Bessbrook United
Orangefield Old Boys	4–2	Saintfield United
Portstewart	3–0	Southend United
Seapatrick	3–2	1st Bangor Old Boys
Shorts	2–2	Dromore Amateurs
Tandragee Rovers	4–1	Roe Valley
UUC	2–4	Laurelvale
Wellington Recreation	1–1	Downshire Young Men

==== Replays ====
Team 1	Score	Team 2
Bessbrook United	3–3 (a.e.t.) (2–3 p)	Malachians
Downshire Young Men	2–0	Wellington Recreation
Dromore Amateurs	1–3	Shorts
Dungiven Celtic	3–0	Islandmagee
Glebe Rangers	5–6	Ards Rangers
Northern Telecom	1–2	East Belfast

=== Third round ===
Team 1	Score	Team 2
1st Liverpool	2–1	Orangefield Old Boys
Annagh United	1–3	Harland & Wolff Welders
Cullybackey	2–3	Ards Rangers
Dungiven Celtic	3–0	Seapatrick
Laurelvale	1–2	East Belfast
Malachians	2–1	Downshire Young Men
Portstewart	2–1	Tandragee Rovers
Shorts	0–0	Larne Tech Old Boys

==== Replay ====
Team 1	Score	Team 2
Larne Tech Old Boys	3–2	Shorts

=== Fourth round ===
Team 1	Score	Team 2
1st Liverpool	1–1	Portstewart
Ballinamallard United	1–1	Crumlin United
Ballymoney United	1–3	Larne Tech Old Boys
Banbridge Town	3–3	Loughgall
British Telecom	0–2	Dungiven Celtic
Crewe United	2–4	Cookstown United
Drumaness Mills	2–3	East Belfast
Dundela	1–1	Harland & Wolff Welders
Dungannon Swifts	2–0	Moyola Park
Dunmurry Recreation	0–1	Armagh City
Kilmore Recreation	3–2	Coagh United
Limavady United	1–1	Ards Rangers
Malachians	4–3	FC Enkalon
Park	2–2	Chimney Corner
RUC	w/o	Donegal Celtic
Tobermore United	1–0	Brantwood

==== Replays ====
Team 1	Score	Team 2
Chimney Corner	2–0	Park
Crumlin United	4–0	Ballinamallard United
Dundela	3–0	Harland & Wolff Welders
Limavady United	2–1	Ards Rangers
Loughgall	1–4	Banbridge Town
Portstewart	0–1	1st Liverpool

=== Fifth round ===
Team 1	Score	Team 2
Ards	10–0	Cookstown United
Armagh City	2–1	Dundela
Bangor	0–4	Portadown
Chimney Corner	0–1	Ballymena United
Crumlin United	0–8	Linfield
Crusaders	4–0	Dungiven Celtic
Distillery	4–2	Larne Tech Old Boys
Dungannon Swifts	2–4	Omagh Town
East Belfast	4–1	Malachians
Glenavon	12–0	1st Liverpool
Glentoran	4–1	Limavady United
Kilmore Recreation	0–3	Cliftonville
Larne	3–0	Banbridge Town
Newry Town	2–1	Coleraine
RUC	2–3	Carrick Rangers
Tobermore United	2–3	Ballyclare Comrades

=== Sixth round ===
Team 1	Score	Team 2
Ards	1–0	Larne
Ballyclare Comrades	0–1	Crusaders
Ballymena United	4–0	Armagh City
Carrick Rangers	1–0	Newry Town
Glenavon	3–1	Cliftonville
Glentoran	2–0	Distillery
Linfield	1–0	East Belfast
Portadown	3–1	Omagh Town

=== Quarter-finals ===
Team 1	Score	Team 2
Crusaders	2–0	Linfield
Glenavon	3–1	Carrick Rangers
Glentoran	1–0	Ballymena United
Portadown	2–1	Ards

=== Semi-finals ===
Team 1	Score	Team 2
Glenavon	1–1	Portadown
Glentoran	2–2	Crusaders

==== Replays ====
Team 1	Score	Team 2
Crusaders	1–2	Glentoran
Portadown	1–4	Glenavon

=== Final ===
4 May 1996

Glentoran	1 – 0	Glenavon
Little 85'	Report

Windsor Park, Belfast
