= 2026–27 NCL Premier =

Association football league in Northern Ireland

NCL Premier
- Season: 2026–27
- Dates: 7 August 2026 – April 2027
- Matches: 54
- Goals: 185 (3.43 per match)
- Biggest home win: Portstewart 9–0 Banbridge Town (31 October 2026)
- Biggest away win: Banbridge Town 1–5 Ballymacash Rangers (22 August 2026)
- Highest scoring: Portstewart 9–0 Banbridge Town (31 October 2026)
- All statistics correct as of 7 November 2026.

The 2026–27 National Conference League Premier is the first season of the NCL Premier. It succeeded the NIFL Premier Intermediate League as the third tier of the Northern Ireland football league system. It is the top and during this season the only division of the newly created National Conference League operated by the National Amateur Football League, with League One and League Two planned to be launched next season as the second and the third divisions of the NCL.

== Teams ==
Locations of the 2026–27 NCL Premier teams
Locations of the 2026–27 NCL Premier teams based in Belfast and Lisburn

The league consists of twelve teams; ten teams remaining from the last season of the NIFL Premier Intermediate League, two teams promoted from regional leagues. The competition consists of a full double round robin of 22 matches, followed by a split into halves and further double round robin of 10 matches.

Four teams were promoted into the NIFL Championship from the 2025–26 NIFL Premier Intermediate League, with the other 10 teams all going into the NCL Premier.

The promotion into the 2026–27 NCL Premier was done following applications. The two promoted teams were St James' Swifts F.C., the champions of the 2025–26 Ballymena & Provincial Football League Intermediate Division 1, and Rosario Youth Club F.C. who placed 5th in the Northern Amateur Football League Premier Division.

Club	Stadium	Location
Ballyclare Comrades	Dixon Park	Ballyclare
Ballymacash Rangers	The Bluebell Stadium	Lisburn
Banbridge Town	Crystal Park	Banbridge
Coagh United	Hagan Park	Coagh
Dergview	Darragh Park	Castlederg
Dollingstown	Planters Park	Dollingstown
Knockbreda	Breda Park	Belfast
Lisburn Distillery	New Grosvenor Stadium	Lisburn
Oxford Sunnyside	Knockramer Park	Lurgan
Portstewart	Mullaghacall	Portstewart
Rosario Y.C.	Ulidia Playing Fields	Belfast
St James' Swifts	Donegal Celtic Park	Belfast

== Matches 1–22 ==
For matches 1–22, each team plays every other team twice (home and away).

=== League table ===
Pos	Team	Pld	W	D	L	GF	GA	GD	Pts	Qualification
1	Portstewart	9	8	0	1	31	9	+22	24	Qualification for Section A
2	Dergview	9	6	1	2	18	10	+8	19	Qualification for Section A
3	Lisburn Distillery	10	5	1	4	25	20	+5	16	Qualification for Section A
4	Dollingstown	9	4	3	2	15	11	+4	15	Qualification for Section A
5	Ballyclare Comrades	10	4	3	3	15	13	+2	15	Qualification for Section A
6	Ballymacash Rangers	9	4	2	3	17	10	+7	14	Qualification for Section A
7	St James' Swifts	7	4	2	1	12	6	+6	14	Qualification for Section B
8	Rosario Y.C.	9	3	2	4	13	14	−1	11	Qualification for Section B
9	Oxford Sunnyside	8	3	2	3	14	18	−4	11	Qualification for Section B
10	Knockbreda	10	2	2	6	13	22	−9	8	Qualification for Section B
11	Coagh United	8	1	2	5	10	15	−5	5	Qualification for Section B
12	Banbridge Town	10	0	0	10	2	37	−35	0	Qualification for Section B

Updated to match(es) played on 7 November 2026. Source: NCL Premier
Rules for classification: 1) Points per game; 2) Goal difference; 3) Number of goals scored; 4) Head-to-head points; 5) Head-to-head goal difference; 6) Drawing of lots

=== Results ===
Home \ Away	BCC	BMR	BAN	COA	DER	DOL	KNO	LIS	OXF	POR	ROS	SJS
Ballyclare Comrades	—	1–0	4–1	1–0		0–2	3–0		2–2			
Ballymacash Rangers		—					4–1	4–2			3–0	1–2
Banbridge Town		1–5	—		0–3			0–3	0–2			0–3
Coagh United				—	1–2			0–1		1–3		
Dergview	0–0				—	4–1		3–2		1–2	1–0	
Dollingstown		0–0	3–0	2–3		—				3–2		0–0
Knockbreda		0–0	4–0		2–3	0–2	—				3–3	2–1
Lisburn Distillery	5–2					2–2		—	5–1	2–4	2–1	
Oxford Sunnyside				2–2	2–1		3–0		—	1–4		
Portstewart		3–0	9–0				3–1			—	1–0	
Rosario Y.C.	2–1		1–0	2–2					4–1		—	
St James' Swifts	1–1			2–1				3–1				—

Updated to match(es) played on 7 November 2026. Source: NCL Premier
Legend: Blue = home team win; Yellow = draw; Red = away team win.

== Matches 23–32 ==
For the final ten matches, the table splits into two halves, with the top six teams forming Section A and the bottom six teams forming Section B. Each team plays every other team in their respective section twice (home and away).

The winners of Section A are the champions, and they get promoted to the 2026–27 NIFL Championship, while the runners-up go into a two-legged play-off against the second-bottom team in the Championship for another place in the Championship. The bottom club in Section B gets relegated into the NCL League One that is set to be created in 2027.
