= 1982–83 Irish Cup =

Tournament details
- Country: Northern Ireland
- Teams: 32

Final positions
- Champions: Glentoran (10th title)
- Runners-up: Linfield

Tournament statistics
- Matches played: 41
- Goals scored: 132 (3.22 per match)

The 1982–83 Irish Cup was the 103rd edition of the Irish Cup, Northern Ireland's premier football knock-out cup competition. It began on 22 January 1983, and concluded on 7 May 1983 with the replayed final. The cup was expanded this season, doubling the number of clubs taking part to 32. The extra clubs meant that an additional round was added to the competition.

Linfield were the defending champions after winning their 33rd Irish Cup last season, defeating Coleraine 2–1 in the 1982 final. This season they reached the final again, but lost to archrivals Glentoran after a replay. Glentoran won their 10th Irish Cup, defeating Linfield 2–1 in the final replay, after the first game was a 1–1 draw.

== Results ==
=== First round ===
Team 1	Score	Team 2
Ballymoney United	4–2	Stranmillis College
Banbridge Town	3–0	Ulster Polytechnic
Bangor	0–1	Ards
Brantwood	1–2	Larne
Distillery	2–3	Linfield
Dundela	2–2	Ballyclare Comrades
Dunmurry Rec.	0–4	Carrick Rangers
Glenavon	0–2	Crusaders
Glentoran	4–0	Ballymena United
Limavady United	1–1	New University of Ulster
Newry Town	0–2	Cliftonville
Omagh Town	1–1	Coleraine
Portadown	0–1	Milford Everton
POSC	0–4	Dungannon Swifts
Roe Valley	0–0	Cookstown United
RUC	1–1	Tobermore United

==== Replays ====
Team 1	Score	Team 2
Ballyclare Comrades	2–0	Dundela
Cookstown United	1–1	Roe Valley
Coleraine	8–0	Omagh Town
New University of Ulster	0–3	Limavady United
Tobermore United	2–6	RUC

==== Second replay ====
Team 1	Score	Team 2
Roe Valley	2–0	Cookstown United

=== Second round ===
Team 1	Score	Team 2
Ballyclare Comrades	3–2	Milford Everton
Ballymoney United	0–2	Glentoran
Banbridge Town	1–1	Larne
Cliftonville	3–1	Carrick Rangers
Crusaders	1–2	Coleraine
Dungannon Swifts	0–3	Ards
Limavady United	1–1	RUC
Roe Valley	0–5	Linfield

==== Replays ====
Team 1	Score	Team 2
Larne	2–1	Banbridge Town
RUC	6–1	Limavady United

=== Quarter-finals ===
Team 1	Score	Team 2
Ards	2–1	Larne
Ballyclare Comrades	1–1	Cliftonville
Coleraine	2–3	Glentoran
Linfield	3–1	RUC

==== Replay ====
Team 1	Score	Team 2
Cliftonville	0–1	Ballyclare Comrades

=== Semi-finals ===
Team 1	Score	Team 2
Ballyclare Comrades	0–3	Glentoran
Linfield	2–1	Ards

=== Final ===
30 April 1983

Linfield	1 – 1	Glentoran
McKeown (pen.)	Report	Mullan

Windsor Park, Belfast

==== Replay ====
7 May 1983

Glentoran	2 – 1	Linfield
Jameson x2	Report	McGaughey

The Oval, Belfast
