= 2013–14 Northern Ireland Football League Cup =

WASP Solutions League Cup

Tournament details
- Country: Northern Ireland
- Teams: 42

Final positions
- Champions: Cliftonville (3rd win)
- Runners-up: Crusaders

Tournament statistics
- Matches played: 41
- Goals scored: 154 (3.76 per match)

The 2013–14 Northern Ireland Football League Cup (known as the WASP Solutions League Cup in the final for sponsorship purposes) was the 28th edition of the Northern Ireland Football League Cup, Northern Ireland's secondary football knockout cup competition, and the first season under the control of the Northern Ireland Football League. It was contested by the 12 members of the NIFL Premiership and the 30 members of the NIFL Championship. The competition began on 13 August 2013 and ended on 25 January 2014 with the final. The competition was without a principal sponsor up until the final, as Irn Bru ended their sponsorship following the conclusion of the 2012–13 competition. WASP Solutions became the Cup's new sponsor in January 2014.

Cliftonville were the defending champions after defeating Crusaders 4–0 in the 2012–13 final to become the sixth different winner of the cup in six seasons. Newington made their debut in the competition this season, following their promotion to the NIFL Championship for the first time in the club's history.

In a repeat of the previous season, Cliftonville and Crusaders met in the final once again, which was played at Solitude for the first time. Cliftonville retained the trophy to lift it for the third time by winning 3–2 on penalties following a 0–0 draw after extra time. They became the first club to retain the trophy since Linfield won three consecutive cups in 1997–98, 1998–99 and 1999–2000.

== Format ==
The competition was played in a straight knockout format and was open to all members of the NIFL Premiership and both divisions of the NIFL Championship. The top 16 ranked clubs from last season received byes into the second round, which included the 12 members of the 2012–13 IFA Premiership and the top four ranked clubs from the 2012–13 IFA Championship 1. Of the remaining 26 Championship clubs, 20 entered the competition in the first round, with the other 6 given byes to the second round. The 6 clubs to receive byes were randomly drawn. Replays were not used in the competition - all matches used extra time and penalties to determine the winner if necessary.

Round	Draw date	First match date	Fixtures	Clubs
First round	26 July 2013	13 August 2013	10	42 → 32
Second round	12 August 2013	26 August 2013	16	32 → 16
Third round	27 August 2013	8 October 2013	8	16 → 8
Quarter-finals	9 October 2013	12 November 2013	4	8 → 4
Semi-finals	16 November 2013	17 December 2013	2	4 → 2
Final	N/A	25 January 2014	1	2 → 1

== First round ==
The draw for the first round was made on 26 July 2013. The games were played on 13 August 2013. The first round draw was made randomly and included 20 of the 30 clubs from the NIFL Championship. The top 16 ranked clubs from last season received byes into the second round, which included the 12 members of the 2012–13 IFA Premiership and the top four ranked clubs from the 2012–13 IFA Championship 1, along with six other randomly chosen Championship clubs, namely:

Ballymoney United, Bangor, Chimney Corner, Glebe Rangers, Newington and PSNI.

Team 1	Score	Team 2
13 August 2013
Ballyclare Comrades	2–1	Annagh United
Banbridge Town	4–0	Queen's University
Dergview	0–3	Coagh United
Harland & Wolff Welders	1–0	Armagh City
Killymoon Rangers	3–3 (aet) (2–3 p)	Lurgan Celtic
Knockbreda	1–0	Carrick Rangers
Larne	5–3	Portstewart
Limavady United	1–1 (aet) (1–3 p)	Sport & Leisure Swifts
Moyola Park	2–3	Loughgall
Tobermore United	0–1 (aet)	Wakehurst

== Second round ==
The second round draw was made on 12 August 2013, with the games played on 26 August 2013. The top 16 ranked clubs from last season entered the competition at this stage, along with the six other Championship clubs that received byes and the 10 winners from the first round. The second round draw was seeded, so that the top 16 clubs from last season avoided each other.

Team 1	Score	Team 2
26 August 2013
Ballinamallard United	3–0	Banbridge Town
Ballyclare Comrades	0–2	Glentoran
Ballymena United	2–2 (aet) (5–3 p)	Ballymoney United
Chimney Corner	1–8	Dundela
Cliftonville	3–0	Harland & Wolff Welders
Coagh United	1–3	Lisburn Distillery
Coleraine	2–1 (aet)	Loughgall
Donegal Celtic	1–2	Lurgan Celtic
Glenavon	6–0	PSNI
Institute	2–0	Glebe Rangers
Larne	0–1	Dungannon Swifts
Linfield	2–0	Knockbreda
Newington	1–3	Crusaders
Portadown	4–0	Sport & Leisure Swifts
Wakehurst	0–5	Ards
Warrenpoint Town	2–3	Bangor

== Third round ==
The third round draw was made on 17 August 2013, with the games played on 8 and 15 October 2013. Lurgan Celtic were the lowest ranked club to reach this round, as the only representative from Championship 2.

Team 1	Score	Team 2
8 October 2013
Ballymena United	3–0	Ballinamallard United
Cliftonville	5–0	Dundela
Crusaders	4–1 (aet)	Coleraine
Dungannon Swifts	1–1 (aet) (3–4 p)	Ards
Glenavon	4–1	Institute
Glentoran	0–0 (aet) (2–4 p)	Linfield
Portadown	6–0	Lisburn Distillery
15 October 2013
Bangor	8–1	Lurgan Celtic

== Quarter-finals ==
The quarter-final draw was made on 9 October 2013, with the matches played on 12 November 2013. Bangor were the lowest ranked club to reach this round, as the only club from outside the NIFL Premiership.

12 November 2013
19:45 GMT

Ballymena United	4 – 0	Portadown
Cushley 7'; Surgenor 58'; Thompson 86'; Teggart 90' (pen.)	Report

Ballymena Showgrounds, Ballymena

12 November 2013
19:45 GMT

Cliftonville	4 – 0	Bangor
Walsh 7' (og.); Boyce 36'; Gormley 72', 86'	Report

Solitude, Belfast

12 November 2013
19:45 GMT

Glenavon	3 – 3 (a.e.t.)	Ards
Marshall 57', 86'; Patton 77'	Report	Faulkner 19', 22'; Roy 25'
Penalties
	4 – 5

Mourneview Park, Glenavon

12 November 2013
19:45 GMT

Linfield	1 – 1 (a.e.t.)	Crusaders
McCaul 89' (pen.)	Report	Caddell 62'
Penalties
	9 – 10

Windsor Park, Belfast

== Semi-finals ==
The semi-final draw was made on 16 November 2013, with the matches played on 17 December 2013.

17 December 2013
19:45 GMT

Ards	0 – 2	Cliftonville
	Report	Donnelly 26'; Gormley 45'

Clandeboye Park, Bangor

17 December 2013
19:45 GMT

Crusaders	4 – 3 (a.e.t.)	Ballymena United
Caddell 28', 66'; McCutcheon 70' (pen.); Owens 97'	Report	Cushley 24', 27', 45'

Seaview, Belfast

== Final ==
The final was played on 25 January 2014 at Solitude, Belfast.

25 January 2014
17:30 GMT

Cliftonville	0 – 0 (a.e.t.)	Crusaders
	Report
Penalties
McMullan (penalty missed); Gormley (penalty scored); O'Carroll (penalty scored); Caldwell (penalty scored)	3 – 2	Coates (penalty missed); McCutcheon (penalty scored); Hanley (penalty scored); Owens (penalty missed); McClean (penalty missed)

Solitude, Belfast

== See also ==
- 2013–14 NIFL Premiership
- 2013–14 NIFL Championship
- 2013–14 Irish Cup
