= 1985–86 Irish Cup =

Tournament details
- Country: Northern Ireland
- Teams: 30

Final positions
- Champions: Glentoran (12th win)
- Runners-up: Coleraine

Tournament statistics
- Matches played: 34
- Goals scored: 95 (2.79 per match)

The 1985–86 Irish Cup was the 106th edition of the Irish Cup, Northern Ireland's premier football knock-out cup competition. It concluded on 3 May 1986 with the final.

Glentoran were the defending champions after winning their 11th Irish Cup last season, defeating archrivals Linfield 1–0 in the 1985 final replay, after the first game ended 1–1. They successfully defended the cup by beating Coleraine 2–1 in the final. In doing so, they became the first club in 18 years to win the trophy in consecutive seasons. Crusaders were the last club to achieve it, winning the 1967 and 1968 finals.

This season also saw second replays abolished in rounds, though they would still be used to decide the final if necessary. The first tie to be affected by the change was the first round tie between Dungannon Swifts and Tobermore United. Dungannon Swifts won the tie 6–5 on penalties when the replay ended 0–0 after extra time. The old rules would have required a second replay to be played at a neutral venue after the first replay was drawn.

== Results ==
=== First round ===
Cliftonville and Crusaders both received byes into the second round.

Team 1	Score	Team 2
Ards	1–1	Newry Town
Banbridge Town	2–1	Shorts
Bangor	0–0	Larne
Carrick Rangers	4–2	Sirocco Works
Dundela	2–0	Armoy United
Dunmurry Rec.	0–2	Brantwood
Glenavon	1–2	Portadown
Glentoran	3–1	Distillery
Institute	1–5	Ballymena United
Limavady United	2–0	Cookstown United
Linfield	0–2	Coleraine
Oxford United Stars	1–3	Ballyclare Comrades
POSC	0–3	Chimney Corner
Tobermore United	1–1	Dungannon Swifts

==== Replays ====
Team 1	Score	Team 2
Dungannon Swifts	0–0 (aet) (6–5 p)	Tobermore United
Larne	3–1	Bangor
Newry Town	0–2	Ards

=== Second round ===
Team 1	Score	Team 2
Ards	4–1	Crusaders
Ballyclare Comrades	1–1	Glentoran
Brantwood	5–0	Banbridge Town
Carrick Rangers	0–0	Dundela
Dungannon Swifts	0–2	Chimney Corner
Coleraine	2–1	Ballymena United
Portadown	3–1	Larne
Limavady United	1–2	Cliftonville

==== Replays ====
Team 1	Score	Team 2
Dundela	2–3	Carrick Rangers
Glentoran	3–1	Ballyclare Comrades

=== Quarter-finals ===
Team 1	Score	Team 2
Brantwood	1–0	Portadown
Carrick Rangers	0–1	Ards
Chimney Corner	0–4	Coleraine
Glentoran	1–0	Cliftonville

=== Semi-finals ===
Team 1	Score	Team 2
Brantwood	0–3	Glentoran
Coleraine	2–0	Ards

=== Final ===
3 May 1986

Glentoran	2 – 1	Coleraine
Mullan; Millar	Report	Healy (pen.)

Windsor Park, Belfast
Attendance: 8,000
