= 1997–98 Irish League Cup =

Wilkinson Sword League Cup

Tournament details
- Country: Northern Ireland
- Teams: 32

Final positions
- Champions: Linfield (4th win)
- Runners-up: Glentoran

Tournament statistics
- Matches played: 31
- Goals scored: 120 (3.87 per match)

The 1997–98 Irish League Cup (known as the Wilkinson Sword League Cup for sponsorship reasons) was the 12th edition of the Irish League Cup, Northern Ireland's secondary football knock-out cup competition. It concluded on 9 September 1997 with the final.

Crusaders were the defending champions after their first League Cup win last season; a 1–0 victory over Glentoran in the previous final. This season they went out in the quarter-finals to eventual winners Linfield, who lifted their fourth League Cup with a 1–0 victory over arch-rivals Glentoran in the final, condemning the Glens to their second successive League Cup final defeat.

This was the last competition to feature clubs from the Irish League B Division. From the following season onwards, the competition would only be open to senior clubs in the top two divisions.

== First round ==
Team 1	Score	Team 2
Ards	7–2	Brantwood
Ballyclare Comrades	1–2	RUC
Carrick Rangers	1–1 (4–5 p)	Banbridge Town
Chimney Corner	1–0	Cliftonville
Cookstown United	0–5	Larne^{1}
Crusaders	3–0	Armagh City
Dundela	1–4	Ballymena United
Dungannon Swifts	1–0	Distillery
Glenavon	2–0	Harland & Wolff Welders
Glentoran	5–1	Tobermore United
Limavady United	0–2	Bangor
Linfield	7–1	Ballinamallard United
Loughgall	0–1	Portadown
Moyola Park	0–3	Coleraine
Newry Town	3–1	Ballymoney United
Omagh Town	1–6	Institute

^{1} Larne were disqualified for fielding an ineligible player. Cookstown United were reinstated.

== Second round ==
Team 1	Score	Team 2
Bangor	0–3	Portadown
Coleraine	3–5	Crusaders
Glenavon	2-1	Ards
Glentoran	9–2	Dungannon Swifts
Institute	5–1	Banbridge Town
Linfield	3–0	Cookstown United
Newry Town	1–1 (4–5 p)	Ballymena United
RUC	1–2	Chimney Corner

== Quarter-finals ==
Team 1	Score	Team 2
Chimney Corner	1–2	Portadown
Crusaders	0–1	Linfield
Glenavon	6–1	Ballymena United
Glentoran	3–2	Institute

== Semi-finals ==
Team 1	Score	Team 2
Glentoran	1–0	Glenavon
Portadown	1–2	Linfield

== Final ==
9 September 1997

Linfield	1 – 0	Glentoran
Spiers 45'	Report

Windsor Park, Belfast
