= DAFC =

DAFC is an abbreviation that may refer to:

- Davao Aguilas F.C.
- Dover Athletic F.C.
- Dromore Amateurs F.C.
- Dunfermline Athletic F.C.
