= Liam Dunne (footballer) =

Irish footballer (born 1971)

Liam Dunne (born 1 September 1971) is an Irish former soccer player. He played as a midfielder for the Bohemians from 1990 to 1991, for St Johnstone from 1991 to 1993, and for the Crusaders from 1993 to 2007.

== Senior career ==
As a midfielder, he played for Bohemians in 1990 and broke into the first team, making his league debut against Derry City on 2 September of that year. He then joined St Johnstone after his successful performance at the 1991 FIFA World Youth Championship for Ireland. In the 1992/93 season, the St Johnstone manager Alex Totten was sacked and new manager John McClelland had no interest in Dunne. The following season, Bohemians manager Eamonn Gregg brought him back to Dalymount Park.

== Crusaders ==
Dunne was sent on Loan to Crusaders FC of Northern Ireland for his first spell at the club. He played at Seaview under manager Roy Walker. He then made his move permanent to Crusaders. He helped the Crusaders to two consecutive IFA Premiership titles in 1994 and 1995. He often turned out for the IFA XI which is for the best players in the IFA Premiership. Crusaders won the league in 1993/94 and in 1994-95. Dunne tried a move to Portadown FC but this failed after an argument with the manager. Dunne then went to Dundalk where, in 2002, he won the FAI Ford Cup. In 2005 Crusaders manager Stephen Baxter, whom Dunne had played with for Crusaders, asked him to come back to Seaview, but by now the Crusaders were in the second tier of Irish Football, chasing promotion, and they achieved it by winning the IFA Championship in the 2005-06 season. They had also won the Steel & Sons Cup that year. Crusaders went on to finish 6th in the IFA Premiership next season with experienced players such as Dunne and Jeff Spiers working with younger players such as Colin Coates and David Rainey. Dunne retired after the 2006-07 season.

=== Honours ===
While at Seaview, Dunne won two Irish Leagues, one Irish League Cup, The Gold Cup and FAI Cup for Dundalk, the Steel & Sons Cup, the IFA Intermediate League and the George Wilson Cup. Dunne also won 4 caps for the Republic of Ireland U21 Team.

== After Football ==
Now Dunne lives in his hometown Dublin and works as a plumber. He has three children.
