= Vic Hooks =

Northern Irish-born footballer

Personal information
- Full name: Victor Ronald Hooks
- Date of birth: 4 July 1955 (age 71)
- Place of birth: Belfast, Northern Ireland
- Position: Forward

Senior career*
Years	Team	Apps	(Gls)
1971–1972	Manchester United		
1972–1973	Grimsby Town	1	(0)
1973–1976	Glentoran		
1976–1977	Cliftonville		
1977–1978	Crusaders		
1978–1980	Dundela		
1980–1981	Newry Town		
- * Club domestic league appearances and goals

Victor Ronald Hooks (born 4 July 1955) is a former professional footballer who played as a forward.
