= 2016–17 NIFL Premier Intermediate League =

NIFL Premier Intermediate League
- Season: 2016–17
- Champions: Queen's University
- Relegated: Sport & Leisure Swifts

The 2016–17 NIFL Premier Intermediate League was the first season of the NIFL Premier Intermediate League under its new structure, as the third tier of the Northern Ireland Football League - the national football league in Northern Ireland.

Location of teams in the 2016-17 NIFL Premier Intermediate League
Location of the Belfast-based teams in the 2016–17 NIFL Premier Intermediate League

== League table ==
Pos	Team	Pld	W	D	L	GF	GA	GD	Pts	Promotion or relegation (Note: Teams played each other twice (22 matches), before the league split into two groups (the top six and the bottom six) for the last five matches.)
1	Limavady United (C, P)	27	18	4	5	65	26	+39	58	Promotion to NIFL Championship
2	Newry City (P)	27	15	3	9	57	34	+23	48	Qualification to promotion play-off
3	Donegal Celtic	27	13	6	8	51	44	+7	45	
4	Moyola Park	27	13	5	9	45	38	+7	44	
5	Tobermore United	27	11	4	12	40	45	−5	37	
6	Banbridge Town	27	11	2	14	36	41	−5	35	
7	Dundela	27	9	8	10	45	47	−2	35	
8	Queen's University	27	11	1	15	34	42	−8	34	
9	Lisburn Distillery	27	10	4	13	43	53	−10	34	
10	Newington	27	10	3	14	36	49	−13	33	
11	Sport & Leisure Swifts	27	9	3	15	32	52	−20	30	
12	Bangor (R)	27	8	5	14	46	59	−13	29	Relegation to Level 4

Rules for classification: 1st points; 2nd goal difference; 3rd goals scored; 4th head-to-head points; 5th head-to-head goal difference
(C) Champions; (P) Promoted; (R) Relegated
