= 1984–85 Irish Cup =

Tournament details
- Country: Northern Ireland
- Teams: 32

Final positions
- Champions: Glentoran (11th win)
- Runners-up: Linfield

Tournament statistics
- Matches played: 36
- Goals scored: 115 (3.19 per match)

The 1984–85 Irish Cup was the 105th edition of the Irish Cup, Northern Ireland's premier football knock-out cup competition. It began on 19 January 1985, and concluded on 11 May 1985 with the replayed final.

Ballymena United were the defending champions after winning their 5th Irish Cup last season, defeating Carrick Rangers 4–1 in the 1984 final. This season they reached the semi-finals, but lost to Linfield. Glentoran won their 11th Irish Cup, defeating archrivals Linfield 1–0 in the final replay after the first game ended 1–1.

== Results ==
=== First round ===
Team 1	Score	Team 2
Ballyclare Comrades	2–2	Newry Town
Ballymena United	3–0	Michelin
Banbridge Town	2–5	Linfield
Civil Service	0–5	Harland & Wolff Welders
Cliftonville	2–0	Brantwood
Distillery	1–1	Dunmurry Rec.
Downpatrick Rec.	1–5	Limavady United
Bangor	0–3	Ards
Coleraine	2–1	Chimney Corner
Larne	2–1	STC
Portadown	5–1	Barn United
Glenavon	3–1	Crusaders
Glentoran	4–0	Carrick Rangers
Islandmagee	1–1	Ballymoney United
Killyleagh Youth	1–0	Omagh Town
Tobermore United	1–2	RUC

==== Replays ====
Team 1	Score	Team 2
Ballymoney United	3–1	Islandmagee
Dunmurry Rec.	1–3	Distillery
Newry Town	1–3	Ballyclare Comrades

=== Second round ===
Team 1	Score	Team 2
Ards	2–0	Ballymoney United
Ballyclare Comrades	2–2	Glentoran
Ballymena United	2–0	Killyleagh Youth
Distillery	2–0	Limavady United
Coleraine	3–1	RUC
Larne	1–2	Linfield
Portadown	2–1	Harland & Wolff Welders
Glenavon	1–0	Cliftonville

==== Replay ====
Team 1	Score	Team 2
Glentoran	3–1	Ballyclare Comrades

=== Quarter-finals ===
Team 1	Score	Team 2
Ards	0–1	Ballymena United
Distillery	0–3	Glentoran
Portadown	1–2	Linfield
Glenavon	0–4	Coleraine

=== Semi-finals ===
Team 1	Score	Team 2
Ballymena United	0–3	Linfield
Coleraine	1–2	Glentoran

=== Final ===
4 May 1985

Glentoran	1 – 1	Linfield
Mullan 24'	Report	McKeown 42'

The Oval, Belfast

==== Replay ====
11 May 1985

Linfield	0 – 1	Glentoran
	Report	Mooney 36' (o.g.)

Windsor Park, Belfast
