= NCL Premier =

The NCL Premier is the name of multiple sport leagues:

- National Conference League Premier, a football division in Northern Ireland since 2026
- National Conference League Premier Division, a former rugby division in England (1987–2026)

== See also ==
- NCEL Premier Division
