= David Lyner =

Northern Irish footballer

Personal information
- Date of birth: 9 January 1893
- Place of birth: Belfast, Ireland
- Date of death: 5 December 1973 (aged 80)
- Place of death: Belfast, Northern Ireland
- Height: 5 ft 9 in (1.75 m)
- Position: Outside forward

Senior career*
Years	Team	Apps	(Gls)
- Owen O'Cork
?–1912	Distillery	0	(0)
1912–1922	Glentoran	288	(53)
1922	Manchester United	3	(0)
1922–1924	Kilmarnock	45	(6)
1924–1925	Queen's Island		
1925	Dundela		
1925	Clydebank	8	(1)
1925–1926	Mid Rhondda		
1926–1927	New Brighton	21	(1)
1927–1928	Glentoran	18	(3)
1928–1929	Queens Island		

International career
1919–1923	Ireland	6	(0)
- * Club domestic league appearances and goals

David Lyner (9 January 1893 – 5 December 1973) was a Northern Irish footballer who played as an outside forward for various clubs in Northern Ireland, England and Scotland in the 1910s and 1920s, including Distillery, Glentoran, Manchester United and Kilmarnock.

== Career ==
=== Club career ===
Born in Belfast, Lyner began his career with local club Owen O'Cork before moving across town to play for Distillery. Then, at the age of 19, he moved to another Belfast club, Glentoran, where he spent a full 10 seasons, playing in 288 league matches and scoring 53 goals. His brother Roly was a teammate at the club.

Although he was now 29 years old, Lyner had obviously impressed enough to warrant a transfer to England's Manchester United, who had just been relegated to the Second Division. Signed in August 1922, Lyner made his debut for United on 23 September 1922, playing in a 2–0 away defeat to Coventry City. He also played in the club's next two games, a 2–1 home win over Coventry City on 30 September and a 2–1 home defeat to Port Vale on 7 October, but, having failed to make a decent impression, these were to be his only appearances for Manchester United, and he was transferred to Kilmarnock in December 1922.

The 1924–25 season was quite eventful for Lyner. After starting the season at Kilmarnock, he moved back to Northern Ireland to play for Queen's Island. He then moved to Dundela, another Belfast side, before joining Scotland's Clydebank for the end of the season, taking his total of clubs for 1924–25 to four. He then spent a brief stint with Wales' Mid Rhondda in the 1925–26 season, before joining New Brighton for the 1926–27 season. The 1927–28 season saw Lyner return to Northern Ireland for the last time, joining Glentoran, before he spent his final season with Queen's Island. He retired from football at the end of the 1928–29 season, at the age of 36.

=== International career ===
Lyner's international career began in 1919, when he was selected for Ireland's first two matches of the 1920 British Home Championship, against England on 25 October 1919, and against Wales on 14 February 1920. The matches finished at 1–1 and 2–2 respectively. He then played in the matches against Scotland and Wales in the 1922 British Home Championship, losing 2–1 to Scotland and drawing 1–1 with Wales. Lyner's involvement in the 1923 British Home Championship spanned his time with two different clubs: when he played in Ireland's 2–0 away defeat to England, he was a Manchester United player, but by the time of his only win with the Irish team, a 3–0 away win over Wales, he had signed for Kilmarnock.

== Honours ==
Glentoran

- Irish Football League (2): 1912–13, 1920–21
- Irish Cup (2): 1913–14, 1916–17
