= Liam Boyce =

Northern Irish footballer (born 1991)

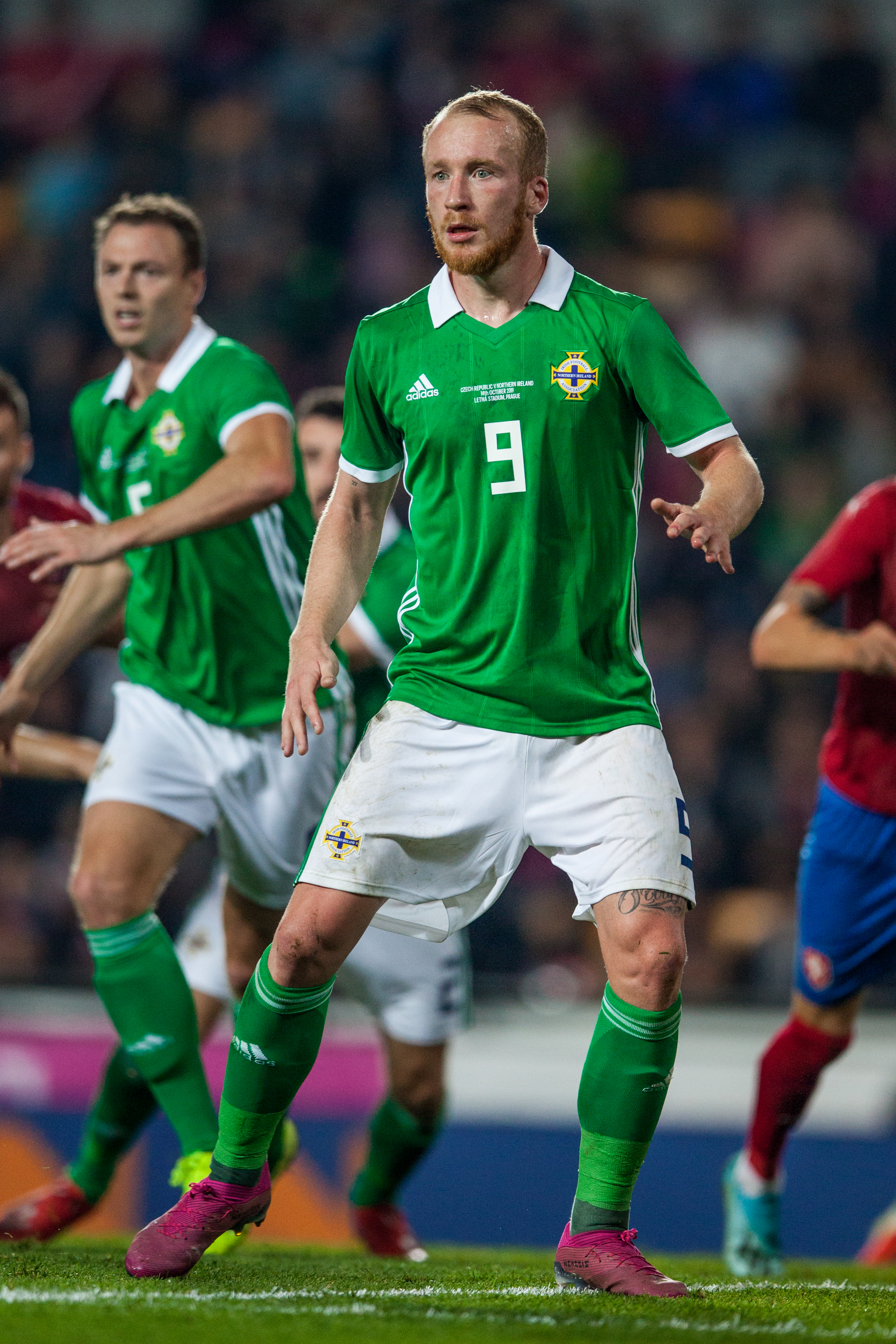
- Boyce playing for Northern Ireland in 2019

Personal information
- Full name: Liam Boyce
- Date of birth: 8 April 1991 (age 35)
- Place of birth: Belfast, Northern Ireland
- Height: 1.84 m (6 ft 0 in)
- Position: Forward

Team information
- Current team: Derry City
- Number: 27

Senior career*
Years	Team	Apps	(Gls)
2008–2010	Cliftonville	52	(18)
2010–2011	Werder Bremen II	3	(0)
2012–2014	Cliftonville	85	(51)
2014–2017	Ross County	99	(48)
2017–2020	Burton Albion	78	(22)
2020–2025	Heart of Midlothian	93	(28)
2025–	Derry City	36	(9)

International career^{‡}
2008–2009	Northern Ireland U19	6	(1)
2010–2012	Northern Ireland U21	9	(0)
2011–2021	Northern Ireland	28	(2)
- * Club domestic league appearances and goals as of 9 November 2026 (UTC) ‡ National team caps and goals as of 31 May 2021 (UTC)

Liam Boyce (born 8 April 1991) is a Northern Irish professional footballer who plays as a forward for League of Ireland Premier Division club Derry City and the Northern Ireland national team.

Boyce began his career at Cliftonville and returned to the club following a short spell at Werder Bremen II. He has since played for Ross County, Burton Albion and joined Heart of Midlothian in January 2020. Boyce made his debut for the Northern Ireland national team in February 2011.

== Club career ==
=== Cliftonville ===
Boyce began his career at Cliftonville, scoring 19 goals in his debut season. He won the IFA Premiership Player of the Month Award for April 2010, and was named the Northern Ireland Football Writers' Player of the Year for the 2009–10 season. Boyce is from the Lower Falls in Belfast. He played for Immaculata for most of his youth years, during this time he attended St Joseph's Primary School Slate Street and St Mary's Grammar School, located on the Glen Road in Belfast, he spent all his secondary school years there and went on to study A Levels.

He was spotted by Cliftonville, and they signed him. He spent his first year there playing in the reserves but in the 2009–10 season, Boyce became a first team regular.

Boyce went on trial with Scottish club Celtic in July 2010, and then held discussions in mid-August 2010 about a move to German club Greuther Fürth, but the move collapsed a few days later.

Boyce scored his first European goal against PFC CSKA Sofia in the 2010–11 UEFA Europa League

=== Werder Bremen ===
Boyce eventually signed for German club Werder Bremen on 31 August 2010. He was released by the German club in October 2011, having only made three appearances for the club's reserves side.

=== Return to Cliftonville ===
Boyce rejoined Cliftonville in January 2012. In the 2012–13 season, he helped Cliftonville win the league title for the first time since 1998, finishing as the league's top scorer with 29 league goals. He was also named as the 2012–13 Ulster Footballer of the Year and Northern Ireland Football Writers' Player of the Year. He won a second league title with the north Belfast club in 2013–14, scoring another 21 league goals before, in July 2014, the club announced that it had withdrawn its offer of a new contract to Boyce. During this spell at the Reds, Boyce made eight appearances in European football, scoring once against Kalmar FF in the qualifiers of the 2012–13 UEFA Europa League.

=== Ross County ===
On 13 June 2014, it was announced Boyce had signed a pre-contract with Ross County. On 13 April 2015, Boyce scored County's first ever top-flight hat-trick in a 3–0 win at St Mirren. He then enjoyed a prolific season in 2015–16, scoring 17 goals in 24 games. Boyce signed a new contract with County in February 2016. He was the top goalscorer in the 2016–17 Scottish Premiership, with 23 goals.

=== Burton Albion ===
On 20 June 2017, Boyce became a club record signing for EFL Championship side Burton Albion, agreeing a three-year contract with the club. Just weeks later, in a pre-season friendly match against Shrewsbury Town, Boyce suffered a serious knee injury that would keep him out of action for most of the 2017–18 season. He returned to action on 3 February 2018, scoring as Burton lost 3–2 to Aston Villa. On 21 April, Boyce scored an injury-time winner that relegated Sunderland.

=== Heart of Midlothian ===
Boyce signed for Heart of Midlothian in January 2020 on a three-and-a-half-year deal. He scored the winning goal in the 83rd minute of his debut against Rangers.

=== Derry City ===
On 11 January 2025, Boyce signed for League of Ireland Premier Division club Derry City on a two-year contract. Boyce scored 11 goals in 26 appearances in all competitions, before his first season with the club was ended three months prematurely on 16 August 2025, following a hamstring injury in his side's FAI Cup exit at home to Drogheda United. On 8 November 2026, he came off the bench late on in a 1–0 win over Waterford in the 2026 FAI Cup final at the Aviva Stadium.

== International career ==
On 31 January 2011, Boyce received his debut call-up to the Northern Ireland national team for the Nations Cup. This call-up came after his move to German club Werder Bremen in September 2010. On 9 February 2011, Boyce made his debut against Scotland, when he came on as a 72nd-minute substitute for Niall McGinn. He received his second call-up for Northern Ireland's Group C match against Serbia in Belgrade on 25 March 2011.

On 2 June 2017, Boyce scored his first goal for Northern Ireland in a 1–0 friendly victory over New Zealand at Windsor Park.

== Career statistics ==
=== Club ===
As of match played on 8 November 2026

Appearances and goals by club, season and competition
Club	Season	League			National cup (Note: Includes Irish Cup, Scottish Cup, FA Cup)		League cup (Note: Includes Northern Ireland Football League Cup, Scottish League Cup, EFL Cup)		Europe		Other		Total	
Club	Season	Division	Apps	Goals	Apps	Goals	Apps	Goals	Apps	Goals	Apps	Goals	Apps	Goals
Cliftonville	2008–09	NIFL Premiership	15	1							–		15	1
Cliftonville	2009–10	NIFL Premiership	34	16							–		34	16
Cliftonville	2010–11	NIFL Premiership	3	1	—		—		4 (Note: Appearances in UEFA Europa League)	1	–		7	2
Cliftonville	Total		52	18					4	1	–		56	19
Werder Bremen II	2010–11	3. Liga	3	0	—		–		—		—		3	0
Cliftonville	2011–12	NIFL Premiership	13	1	1	0	0	0	–		4 (Note: Appearances in Setanta Sports Cup)	1	18	2
Cliftonville	2012–13	NIFL Premiership	36	29	4	0	4	3	2	1	2	1	48	34
Cliftonville	2013–14	NIFL Premiership	36	21	0	0	4	2	2 (Note: Appearances in UEFA Champions League)	0	—		42	23
Cliftonville	Total		85	51	5	0	8	5	4	1	6	2	108	59
Ross County	2014–15	Scottish Premiership	30	10	1	0	2	1	—		—		33	11
Ross County	2015–16	Scottish Premiership	35	15	2	1	5	4	—		—		42	20
Ross County	2016–17	Scottish Premiership	34	23	2	1	4	0	—		—		40	24
Ross County	Total		99	48	5	2	11	5	—		—		115	55
Burton Albion	2017–18	Championship	16	3	0	0	0	0	—		—		16	3
Burton Albion	2018–19	League One	37	11	1	1	6	2	—		1 (Note: Appearance in EFL Trophy)	0	45	14
Burton Albion	2019–20	League One	25	8	2	1	4	5	—		1	0	33	14
Burton Albion	Total		78	22	3	2	10	7	—		2	0	94	31
Heart of Midlothian	2019–20	Scottish Premiership	7	2	2	0	0	0	—		—		9	2
Heart of Midlothian	2020–21	Scottish Championship	25	14	2 (Note: The later stages of the 2019–20 Scottish Cup were played in October and December 2020)	2	1	0	—		0	0	28	16
Heart of Midlothian	2021–22	Scottish Premiership	31	10	5	2	5	4	—		—		41	16
Heart of Midlothian	2022–23	Scottish Premiership	5	1	0	0	0	0	2	0	—		7	1
Heart of Midlothian	2023–24	Scottish Premiership	15	1	0	0	2	0	4 (Note: Appearances in UEFA Europa Conference League)	0	—		21	1
Heart of Midlothian	2024–25	Scottish Premiership	10	0	0	0	1	0	4 (Note: Two appearances in UEFA Europa League, two appearances in UEFA Conference League)	0	—		15	0
Heart of Midlothian	Total		93	28	9	4	9	4	10	0	—		121	36
Derry City	2025	LOI Premier Division	24	8	2	3	—		—		—		26	11
Derry City	2026	LOI Premier Division	12	1	3	0	—		3 (Note: One appearance, one goal in UEFA Europa League; two appearances in UEFA Conference League)	1	0	0	18	2
Derry City	Total		36	9	5	3	—		3	1	0	0	44	13
Career total			446	176	27	11	38	20	21	3	8	2	540	213

=== International ===
As of match played 30 May 2021

Appearances and goals by national team and year
National team	Year	Apps	Goals
Northern Ireland	2011	4	0
Northern Ireland	2015	3	0
Northern Ireland	2016	1	0
Northern Ireland	2017	2	1
Northern Ireland	2018	7	0
Northern Ireland	2019	4	0
Northern Ireland	2020	6	1
Northern Ireland	2021	1	0
Total		28	2

Scores and results list Northern Ireland's goal tally first.

International goals by date, venue, cap, opponent, score, result and competition
No.	Date	Venue	Cap	Opponent	Score	Result	Competition
1	2 June 2017	Windsor Park, Belfast, Northern Ireland	9	New Zealand	1–0	1–0	Friendly
2	18 November 2020	Windsor Park, Belfast, Northern Ireland	27	Romania	1–0	1–1	2020–21 UEFA Nations League B

== Honours ==
Cliftonville

- Irish Premiership: 2012–13, 2013–14
- Irish League Cup: 2012–13, 2013–14
- County Antrim Shield: 2008–09, 2011–12

Ross County

- Scottish League Cup: 2015–16

Hearts

- Scottish Championship: 2020–21
- Scottish Cup runner-up: 2019–20, 2021–22

Derry City

- FAI Cup: 2026

Individual

- Ulster Footballer of the Year: 2012–13
- NIFWA Player of the Year: 2012–13
- Scottish Premiership Top Scorer: 2016–17
- Scottish Championship Top Scorer: 2020–21
- PFA Scotland Players' Player of the Year: 2020–21 Scottish Championship
