= Diarmuid O'Carroll =

Irish footballer

Personal information
- Full name: Diarmuid O'Carroll
- Date of birth: 16 March 1987 (age 39)
- Place of birth: Killarney, Ireland
- Position: Forward

Team information
- Current team: Sparta Prague (Assistant)

Youth career
- 1995–2002: Killarney Athletic
- 2002–2003: Home Farm
- 2003–2006: Celtic

Senior career*
Years	Team	Apps	(Gls)
2003–2008	Celtic	0	(0)
2007	→ Ross County (loan)	15	(2)
2008–2009	Morecambe	29	(5)
2009–2010	Airdrie United	30	(5)
2010	Valur	6	(0)
2011–2012	Glenavon	33	(4)
2012–2014	Cliftonville	65	(12)
2014–2016	Crusaders	53	(13)
2018	Dungannon Swifts	4	(0)
Total		231	(41)

International career
2006	Republic of Ireland U21	4	(0)

Managerial career
- 2015–2017: Crusaders Strikers
- 2019: Glentoran Women
- 2019–2021: Motherwell U18
- 2021–2022: Morecambe (First-team coach)
- 2022–2024: St Mirren (Assistant)
- 2022–2024: St Mirren B
- 2023–: Northern Ireland (Senior Coach)
- 2024–2025: Newcastle United U21
- 2025–: Sparta Prague (Assistant)
- * Club domestic league appearances and goals

Diarmuid O'Carroll (born 16 March 1987) is an Irish retired professional footballer. He has worked in various roles in football such as for the Irish Football Association as Club and Community Development Officer within the Football Development Department.

== Club career ==
Diarmuid O'Carroll started his youth career with Home Farm before joining Celtic's Youth Academy, he had featured for Celtic's reserve side for several years, but did not play for the first team. In 2007, he had a loan spell with Ross County F.C. and, in July 2008, it was announced that O'Carroll had signed a one-year deal with English League Two side Morecambe.

In the summer of 2009 O'Carroll had many trials, including one at Újpest FC, but he did not agree a deal with the Hungarian club. He played for Shamrock Rovers in their win over Hibernian F.C. in July but was not offered a contract One month later he signed a one-year deal with Airdrie United. Due to financial cutbacks at the club, he left in May 2010. O'Carroll then went on trial at Raith Rovers. He scored his first goal for Raith as a trialist away to Forfar Athletic in a pre-season friendly on 13 July 2010. On 30 July he signed for Icelandic side Valur where he also worked as a youth coach.

In November 2010, after returning from Iceland O'Carroll signed a pre-contract agreement with Glenavon in Northern Ireland. He became eligible to play from January 2011. In an Irn-Bru league cup match on 20 September 2011, O'Carroll scored a double hat trick Until this time, he played for amateur side Dollingstown to maintain his match fitness.

He signed for Cliftonville on 3 January 2012 and scored on his debut at Leonidas O'Carroll also worked as a youth coach for the club's academy as well as a consultant for the agency The Copius Group.

== Later career ==
On 7 May 2014, O'Carroll was confirmed to have left Cliftonville after winning back to back league titles and league cups. He then joined Crusaders, signing a two-year pre-contract for the club. During his time at Crusaders as a semi-professional player, O'Carroll was also appointed manager of Crusaders Newtownabbey Strikers in April 2015 (left in January 2017). On the expiration of this contract, Diarmuid had won 4 back to back titles with 2 clubs and then O'Carroll decided to retire from football to focus on coaching.

On 23 November 2018, O'Carroll came out of retirement, signing a short-term deal at Dungannon Swifts.

O'Carroll has completed a number of coaching badges and has a long-term ambition of pursuing this area after he retires from playing. On 27 February 2019, he was appointed manager of Glentoran Women. He left the position in June 2019, to become the Director of Coaching for Downtown Las Vegas Soccer Club.

On 23 September 2019 he took over the role of coach to Motherwell FC's Under 18s. This was a post that had briefly been filled by Darren O'Dea who had moved on to coach the under 18s with Celtic.

On 7 June 2021, O'Carroll joined Morecambe as a first-team coach, joining Stephen Robinson after they had worked together at Motherwell. On 9 January 2022, O'Carroll took charge of Morecambe in a 3-1 FA Cup defeat to Tottenham Hotspur, after manager Stephen Robinson tested positive for COVID-19 on the eve of the match.

On 22 February 2022, O'Carroll was appointed as Robinson's assistant manager at St Mirren. On 13 March 2023, O'Carroll joined Michael O'Neill's backroom staff with the Northern Ireland national team as a senior coach, whilst remaining in his assistant manager role at St. Mirren.

On 16 June 2025, O'Carroll was appointed as Brian Priske's assistant manager at Sparta Prague.

== International career ==
O'Carroll has been capped at every youth level and under 21 for Ireland, but has never played for the Republic of Ireland at full international level.

== Charity work ==
O'Carroll started his charity work by running a half-marathon in aid of Suicide Awareness in June 2010 in Belfast and continued that in October of that year by running the Dublin City Marathon for the same cause.

== Honours ==
Cliftonville

- IFA Premiership (2): 2012–13, 2013–14
- Irish League Cup (2): 2012–13, 2013–14

Crusaders

- NIFL Premiership (2): 2014–15, 2015–16
