= 2017–18 NIFL Premier Intermediate League =

NIFL Premier Intermediate League
- Season: 2017–18
- Dates: 12 August 2017 – 4 May 2018
- Champions: Dundela
- Relegated: Donegal Celtic
- Biggest home win: Queen's University 7-0 Portstewart
- Highest scoring: Queen's University 7-2 Annagh United

The 2017–18 NIFL Premier Intermediate League was the second season of the NIFL Premier Intermediate League, the third tier of the Northern Ireland Football League - the national football league in Northern Ireland. It ran from 12 August 2017 to 4 May 2018 and Dundela were crowned as champions, winning promotion to the 2018–19 NIFL Championship.

== Teams ==
Twelve teams competed in the league. Armagh City and Annagh United from were relegated the 2016–17 NIFL Championship and Portstewart were promoted as the winners of the 2016–17 Northern Ireland Intermediate League.

=== Stadia and locations ===
Location of teams in the 2017-18 NIFL Premier Intermediate League
Location of the Belfast-based teams in the NIFL Premier Intermediate League 2017-18

Club	Location	Stadium	Capacity
Annagh United	Portadown	Tandragee Road	1,250
Armagh City	Armagh	Holm Park	3,000
Banbridge Town	Banbridge	Crystal Park	1,500
Donegal Celtic	Belfast	Donegal Celtic Park	4,200
Dundela	Belfast	Wilgar Park	2,500
Lisburn Distillery	Lisburn	New Grosvenor Stadium	2,200
Moyola Park	Castledawson	Mill Meadow	2,000
Newington YC	Belfast	Seaview	3,383
Portstewart	Portstewart	Seahaven	1,500
Queen's University Belfast	Belfast	Upper Malone	1,000
Sport & Leisure Swifts	Belfast	Glen Road Heights	1,000
Tobermore United	Tobermore	Fortwilliam Park	1,500

== League table ==
Pos	Team	Pld	W	D	L	GF	GA	GD	Pts	Promotion, qualification or relegation (Note: Teams played each other twice (22 matches), before the league split into two groups (the top six and the bottom six) for the last ten matches.)
1	Dundela (C)	27	18	6	3	78	33	+45	60	
2	Queen's University	27	17	2	8	62	39	+23	53	Qualification for the promotion play-offs
3	Banbridge Town	27	14	8	5	55	36	+19	50	
4	Lisburn Distillery	27	15	3	9	46	35	+11	48	
5	Moyola Park	27	10	5	12	46	41	+5	35	
6	Tobermore United	27	8	7	12	47	60	−13	31	
7	Portstewart	27	10	4	13	36	51	−15	34	
8	Sport & Leisure Swifts	27	9	5	13	44	62	−18	32	
9	Armagh City	27	9	4	14	39	44	−5	31	
10	Annagh United	27	10	1	16	41	63	−22	31	
11	Newington	27	7	7	13	40	56	−16	28	
12	Donegal Celtic (R)	27	7	4	16	38	52	−14	25	Relegation to the Ballymena & Provincial Football League

Source: ,
Rules for classification: 1) Points; 2) Goal difference; 3) Number of goals scored; 4) Head-to-head points; 5) Head-to-head goal difference; 6) Play-off (subject to IFA decision)
(C) Champions; (R) Relegated

== Results ==
=== Matches 1–22 ===
During matches 1–22 each team plays every other team twice (home and away).

Home \ Away	ANN	ARM	BAN	DON	DUN	LIS	MOY	NEW	POR	QUB	SLS	TOB
Annagh United	—	1–2	0–3	0–0	1–4	3–1	1–2	2–1	2–1	0–1	3–5	2–4
Armagh City	4–1	—	2–0	1–0	1–2	1–2	0–1	1–2	2–3	0–2	2–0	1–3
Banbridge Town	3–1	2–1	—	2–2	1–1	1–1	1–1	1–0	3–0	2–2	3–2	0–3
Donegal Celtic	2–3	0–0	1–2	—	1–4	2–1	3–2	1–2	1–2	2–1	1–2	6–2
Dundela	3–0	0–0	0–3	4–0	—	2–2	2–0	4–4	5–0	2–1	5–1	3–2
Lisburn Distillery	5–1	1–2	2–5	3–2	1–0	—	2–0	1–2	1–0	2–0	3–0	1–1
Moyola Park	2–1	2–3	2–0	5–0	1–1	2–3	—	5–2	1–0	1–2	3–0	0–0
Newington	0–1	0–4	1–1	0–1	1–4	0–4	0–3	—	2–2	1–2	2–1	1–1
Portstewart	2–0	1–0	1–3	2–1	2–2	0–1	1–5	0–2	—	3–1	1–2	2–0
Queen's University	7–2	3–1	4–1	2–1	2–4	1–0	4–0	4–3	7–0	—	1–2	3–1
Sport & Leisure Swifts	0–2	1–3	2–0	2–1	2–6	1–2	3–3	2–1	2–2	1–3	—	2–1
Tobermore United	0–2	4–1	1–4	4–3	1–2	3–0	4–4	2–2	2–2	2–0	3–3	—

Legend: Blue = home team win; Yellow = draw; Red = away team win.
For upcoming matches, an "a" indicates there is an article about the rivalry between the two participants.

=== Matches 23–27 ===
During matches 23–27 each team will play every other team in their half of the table once.

==== Top six ====
Home \ Away	BAN	DUN	LIS	MOY	QUB	TOB
Banbridge Town	—	–	—	2–1	1–1	5–1
Dundela	2–4	—	—	—	—	5–0
Lisburn Distillery	1–0	0–3	—	—	1–2	—
Moyola Park	—	0–2	0–2	—	—	—
Queen's University	—	2–6	—	1–0	—	3–0
Tobermore United	—	—	1–3	1–0	—	—

Updated to match(es) played on 4 May 2018. Source:
Legend: Blue = home team win; Yellow = draw; Red = away team win.

==== Bottom six ====
Home \ Away	ANN	ARM	DON	NEW	POR	SLS
Annagh United	—	3–1	—	2–4	1–0	—
Armagh City	—	—	2–1	2–2		
Donegal Celtic	4–2	—	—	—	0–1	0–0
Newington	—	—	1–2	—	3–2	—
Portstewart	—	2–0	—	—	—	4–2
Sport & Leisure Swifts	2–4	3–2	—	1–1	—	—

Updated to match(es) played on 4 May 2018. Source:
Legend: Blue = home team win; Yellow = draw; Red = away team win.

== Play-offs ==
=== NIFL Championship play-off ===
The eleventh-placed team from the Championship, Dergview, played the runners-up from the 2017–18 Premier Intermediate League, Queen's University, over two legs for one spot in the NIFL Championship.

11 May 2018
19:45 BST

Queen's University	0-1	Dergview
	BBC Sport

Upper Malone, Belfast

16 May 2018
19:45 BST

Dergview	3-1	Queen's University
	BBC Sport

Darragh Park, Castlederg

Dergiew won 4-1 on aggregate and retained their position in the NIFL Championship with Queen's University remaining in the NIFL Premier Intermediate League.
