= 1987–88 Irish Cup =

Tournament details
- Country: Northern Ireland
- Teams: 23

Final positions
- Champions: Glentoran (14th win)
- Runners-up: Glenavon

Tournament statistics
- Matches played: 25
- Goals scored: 77 (3.08 per match)

The 1987–88 Irish Cup was the 108th edition of the Irish Cup, Northern Ireland's premier football knock-out cup competition. It concluded on 30 April 1988 with the final.

Glentoran were the defending champions after winning their 13th Irish Cup last season by beating Larne 1–0 in the 1987 final. They successfully defended the cup to win it for the fourth year running by beating Glenavon 1–0 in the final. In doing so, they became the first club in history to win four consecutive Irish Cups. To date, the feat has not been achieved again.

== Results ==
=== Qualifying round ===
Team 1	Score	Team 2
Omagh Town	1–2	Brantwood

=== First preliminary round ===
Team 1	Score	Team 2
Banbridge Town	2–1	Dungannon Swifts
Brantwood	2–0	Tobermore United
Chimney Corner	2–1	Ballyclare Comrades
Cookstown United	0–3	Dunmurry Rec.

=== Second preliminary round ===
Team 1	Score	Team 2
Banbridge Town	4–2	Brantwood
Dunmurry Rec.	6–1	Chimney Corner

=== First round ===
The 14 top flight clubs entered in this round, along with the 2 lower league winners from the second preliminary round.

Team 1	Score	Team 2
Ards	4–2	Bangor
Ballymena United	4–0	Dunmurry Rec.
Carrick Rangers	1–2	Glenavon
Cliftonville	0–1	Distillery
Larne	1–1	Linfield
Portadown	3–1	Banbridge Town
Glentoran	3–0	Coleraine
Newry Town	3–0	Crusaders

==== Replay ====
Team 1	Score	Team 2
Linfield	1–0	Larne

=== Quarter-finals ===
Team 1	Score	Team 2
Ballymena United	0–0	Distillery
Glenavon	2–1	Ards
Glentoran	5–0	Newry Town
Linfield	1–1	Portadown

==== Replays ====
Team 1	Score	Team 2
Distillery	0–3	Ballymena United
Portadown	2–0	Linfield

=== Semi-finals ===
Team 1	Score	Team 2
Glenavon	2–0	Ballymena United
Glentoran	3–2	Portadown

=== Final ===
30 April 1988

Glentoran	1 – 0	Glenavon
Cleary 89' (pen.)	Report

Windsor Park, Belfast
