= 2018–19 NIFL Premier Intermediate League =

NIFL Premier Intermediate League
- Season: 2018–19
- Champions: Queen's University
- Relegated: Sport & Leisure Swifts

The 2018–19 NIFL Premier Intermediate League was the third season of the NIFL Premier Intermediate League, the third tier of the Northern Ireland Football League - the national football league in Northern Ireland.

Location of teams in the 2018-19 NIFL Premier Intermediate League
Location of the Belfast-based teams in the 2018–19 NIFL Premier Intermediate League

== League table ==
Pos	Team	Pld	W	D	L	GF	GA	GD	Pts	Promotion or relegation
1	Queen's University (C, P)	22	18	2	2	55	16	+39	56	Promotion to NIFL Championship
2	Annagh United	22	13	5	4	55	26	+29	44	Qualification to promotion play-off
3	Tobermore United	22	13	2	7	48	32	+16	41	
4	Lisburn Distillery	22	10	6	6	41	37	+4	36	
5	Banbridge Town	22	9	6	7	37	27	+10	33	
6	Portstewart	22	9	5	8	28	28	0	32	
7	Newington	22	8	5	9	31	35	−4	29	
8	Moyola Park	22	8	3	11	36	39	−3	27	
9	Dollingstown	22	5	5	12	35	48	−13	20	
10	Armagh City	22	5	5	12	24	44	−20	20	
11	Lurgan Celtic	22	5	4	13	23	48	−25	19	
12	Sport & Leisure Swifts (R)	22	4	2	16	32	65	−33	14	Relegation to Level 4

Rules for classification: 1st points; 2nd goal difference; 3rd goals scored; 4th head-to-head points; 5th head-to-head goal difference
(C) Champions; (P) Promoted; (R) Relegated
