= 1986–87 Irish Cup =

Tournament details
- Country: Northern Ireland
- Teams: 16

Final positions
- Champions: Glentoran (13th win)
- Runners-up: Larne

Tournament statistics
- Matches played: 21
- Goals scored: 49 (2.33 per match)

The 1986–87 Irish Cup was the 107th edition of the Irish Cup, Northern Ireland's premier football knock-out cup competition. It concluded on 2 May 1987 with the final.

Glentoran were the defending champions after winning their 12th Irish Cup last season, defeating Coleraine 2–1 in the 1986 final. They successfully defended the cup for the second year running, by beating Larne 1–0 in the final. In doing so, they became the first club in 94 years to win three consecutive Irish Cups. Linfield were the last club to achieve it, winning the 1891, 1892 and 1893 finals.

This season also saw the number of clubs involved in the competition reduced back to 16 due to the re-structuring of the league system. Only two clubs from outside the 14-club top flight took part, qualifying through preliminary rounds. Omagh Town and Tobermore United qualified to take part in the competition proper, but both clubs went out in the first round.

== Results ==
=== First round ===
Team 1	Score	Team 2
Ards	2–1	Omagh Town
Crusaders	1–1	Newry Town
Distillery	0–0	Cliftonville
Coleraine	3–1	Linfield
Larne	2–0	Ballymena United
Glenavon	1–0	Portadown
Glentoran	3–1	Carrick Rangers
Tobermore United	1–1	Bangor

==== Replays ====
Team 1	Score	Team 2
Cliftonville	1–0	Distillery
Bangor	2–0	Tobermore United
Newry Town	2–0	Crusaders

=== Quarter-finals ===
Team 1	Score	Team 2
Ards	1–2	Larne
Bangor	1–6	Coleraine
Glentoran	3–2	Glenavon
Newry Town	0–0	Cliftonville

==== Replay ====
Team 1	Score	Team 2
Cliftonville	0–2	Newry Town

=== Semi-finals ===
Team 1	Score	Team 2
Coleraine	1–2	Larne
Glentoran	1–1	Newry Town

==== Replay ====
Team 1	Score	Team 2
Newry Town	1–2	Glentoran

=== Final ===
2 May 1987

Glentoran	1 – 0	Larne
Mullan 33'	Report

Windsor Park, Belfast
