= 2012–13 Irish League Cup =

Irn-Bru League Cup

Tournament details
- Country: Northern Ireland
- Teams: 41

Final positions
- Champions: Cliftonville (2nd win)
- Runners-up: Crusaders

Tournament statistics
- Matches played: 40
- Goals scored: 165 (4.13 per match)

The 2012–13 Irish League Cup (known as the Irn-Bru League Cup for sponsorship reasons) was the 27th edition of the Irish League Cup, Northern Ireland's secondary football knock-out cup competition. It was contested by the twelve members of the IFA Premiership, as well as the 29 members of the IFA Championship. The competition began on 14 August 2012, and ended with the final on 26 January 2013.

Crusaders were the defending champions after defeating Coleraine 1–0 in the 2011–12 final. They reached the final again this season, but were unable to defend the trophy as they were defeated 4–0 by Cliftonville in the final, who lifted the cup for the second time. This made it six different winners of the cup in the last six seasons. The 4–0 scoreline equalled the record for the highest in a final, set when Linfield defeated Coleraine by the same score in 2000.

== Format ==
The competition was played in a straight knock-out format and was open to all members of the IFA Premiership and both divisions of the IFA Championship. Twenty clubs from the IFA Championship entered in the first round, with the remaining ten Championship clubs given byes into the second round. They were joined by the twelve members of the IFA Premiership. Newry City were expelled from the IFA this season and their result in the second round match against Dergview was expunged from the records. Replays were not used in the competition - all matches used extra time and penalties to determine the winner if necessary.

Round	Draw date	First match date	Fixtures	Clubs
First round	24 July 2012	14 August 2012	10	41 → 31
Second round	24 July 2012	27 August 2012	15	31 → 16
Third round	29 August 2012	9 October 2012	8	16 → 8
Quarter-finals	10 October 2012	5 November 2012	4	8 → 4
Semi-finals	7 November 2012	11 December 2012	2	4 → 2
Final	N/A	26 January 2013	1	2 → 1

== First round ==
The draw for the first round was made on 24 July 2012. The games were played on 14 August 2012. The first round draw was made randomly and included all 29 clubs from the IFA Championship. 20 of those clubs were drawn to face each other with the remaining 9 receiving a bye into the next round.

Armagh City, Ballymoney United, Bangor, Carrick Rangers, Coagh United, Dundela, Institute, Killymoon Rangers, and Limavady United all received byes into the second round.

Team 1	Score	Team 2
Ards	4–0	Annagh United
Banbridge Town	2–1	Queen's University
Dergview	7–1	Ballyclare Comrades
Glebe Rangers	1–0	Larne
Knockbreda	1–0	Warrenpoint Town
Loughgall	0–4	Lurgan Celtic
Moyola Park	0–1	Tobermore United
Portstewart	1–3	Harland & Wolff Welders
PSNI	4–3	Chimney Corner
Sport & Leisure Swifts	3–3 (a.e.t.) (5–4 p)	Wakehurst

== Second round ==
The draw for the second round was also made on 24 July 2012. The games were played on 27 August 2012. The draw was later revised, switching some venues to the club originally drawn to play away from home.

The 12 members of the IFA Premiership entered the draw at this stage, along with the 10 winners from the first round matches, and the 9 clubs that received byes. Dergview were effectively given a bye to the third round, after their 2–1 second round victory over Newry City was later expunged from the official records. The draw was seeded so that the IFA Premiership clubs and the top 4 clubs from last season's second tier (IFA Championship 1) avoided each other.

Team 1	Score	Team 2
Ballinamallard United	4–1	Knockbreda
Ballymena United	4–1	Lurgan Celtic
Ballymoney United	1–4	Coleraine
Bangor	4–2	Armagh City
Cliftonville	4–1	Tobermore United
Crusaders	3–0	Glebe Rangers
Donegal Celtic	1–2	Harland & Wolff Welders
Dungannon Swifts	2–2 (a.e.t.) (6–7 p)	Coagh United
Glenavon	6–1	Sport & Leisure Swifts
Glentoran	3–1	PSNI
Institute	1–0	Banbridge Town
Killymoon Rangers	0–5	Carrick Rangers
Limavady United	1–3	Lisburn Distillery
Linfield	3–1	Ards
Portadown	3–0	Dundela

== Third round ==
The draw for the third round was made on 29 August 2012. Six clubs from IFA Championship 1 made it through to the third round along with the ten remaining clubs from the top flight, but none made it through from Championship 2. The matches were played on 9 October 2012.

Team 1	Score	Team 2
Ballymena United	3–1	Harland & Wolff Welders
Bangor	0–4	Portadown
Carrick Rangers	3–4	Crusaders
Cliftonville	5–0	Ballinamallard United
Coleraine	0–1 (a.e.t.)	Linfield
Glenavon	2–1	Dergview
Institute	2–2 (a.e.t.) (2–4 p)	Glentoran
Lisburn Distillery	9–0	Coagh United

== Quarter-finals ==
The quarter-finals draw was made on 10 October 2012. No club from outside the IFA Premiership reached this stage. The matches were played on 5 November 2012.

5 November 2012
19:45 GMT

Ballymena United	0 – 6	Linfield
	Report	Thompson 20'; Black 30'; Carvill 35'; McCaul 37', 44'; Browne 83'

The Showgrounds, Ballymena

5 November 2012
19:45 GMT

Cliftonville	3 – 1	Portadown
Gormley 70'; Boyce 75'; O'Carroll 82'	Report	Ramsey 2'

Solitude, Belfast

5 November 2012
19:45 GMT

Crusaders	3 – 1	Lisburn Distillery
Heatley 12'; Adamson 63'; Caddell 65'	Report	Hughes 87'

Seaview, Belfast

5 November 2012
19:45 GMT

Glenavon	2 – 1	Glentoran
McGrory 11', 47'	Report	Callacher 82'

Mourneview Park, Lurgan

== Semi-finals ==
The semi-finals draw was made on 7 November 2012. The matches were played on 11 December 2012.

11 December 2012
19:45 GMT

Cliftonville	3 – 0	Glenavon
Garrett 45+1'; McMullan 65' (pen.); Boyce 81'	Report

Solitude, Belfast

11 December 2012
19:45 GMT

Linfield	0 – 1	Crusaders
	Report	Owens 64'

Windsor Park, Belfast

== Final ==
The final was played on 26 January 2013 at Windsor Park.

26 January 2013
17:30 GMT

Cliftonville	4 – 0	Crusaders
O'Carroll 23'; Gormley 25', 72'; Catney 74'	Report	Heatley (red card) 50'

Windsor Park, Belfast
Attendance: 4,948
