= Rosario Youth Club F.C. =

Association football club in Northern Ireland

Rosario Youth
- Full name: Rosario Youth Football Club
- Nickname: The Roses
- Founded: 1912
- Ground: Ulidia Playing Fields, Belfast
- Capacity: 250
- Chairman: Ciara Boyes
- League: NCL Premier
- 2025–2026: NAFL Premier Division, 5th
- Website: http://www.rosarioyfc.com/

Rosario Youth Football Club (also known as Rosario Y.C.) is a Northern Irish, intermediate, football club playing in the National Conference League Premier. The club has three senior teams competing in the Northern Amateur Football League and Belfast and District football league. The club is one of the most successful youth clubs in Northern Ireland, and a number of former players have played at international level and in professional leagues in England. The club joined the Amateur League in 1982.

== Honours ==
- NAFL 1B: 1
  - 2001–02
- NAFL 2B: 1
  - 1991–92
- Cochrane Corry Cup: 1
  - 1993–94
