= St James' Swifts F.C. =

Association football club in Northern Ireland

St. James' Swifts
- Full name: St. James' Swifts Football Club
- Nickname: Swifts
- Founded: 2010
- Ground: Donegal Celtic Park, Belfast
- League: NCL Premier
- 2025–26: Ballymena & Provincial Football League Intermediate Division 1, 1st of 9 (champions; promoted)
Home colours

St James' Swifts are an intermediate-level football club from St. James area of west Belfast, in Northern Ireland, playing in the NCL Premier. The club was formed in 2010 and entered the intermediate ranks in 2017. It has a number of under-age teams, 3x Senior Men’s Teams and a Ladies team. The club plays in the Irish Cup.

== History ==
The club was formed in 2010 as a response to anti social problems in the area, and started as a 6-aside team playing on a Friday night, before becoming a junior 11-aside team, joining the Belfast & District football league (BDFL).

They would soon grow into one of the top Amatuer League sides in Northern Ireland, harbouring ambitions to play in the Northern Ireland Football League and Irish Premier League.

They became an intermediate level side in 2017 by joining the Ballymena & Provincial Football League (BPIL).

They won the Ballymena League in 2021/22 but missed out on promotion to Ballymacash Rangers.

St James’ eventually won the league again in 2025/26 and with that gained promotion to the newly form National Conference League, becoming one of its founding members.

In 2026 the reached the Steel & Sons Cup Final for the first time in the clubs history.

The club has a partnership with English side Billericay Town which consists of activities such as pre season friendlies, and joint fundraising on suicide awareness initiatives.

In 2023, former Celtic, Cliftonville and Portadown midfielder Paul George signed for the club.

St James’ Swifts Ladies team were formed in 2020 and compete in the NIWFA Championship. The Ladies side won the NIWFA Championship Title in 2024/25.

Honours:

Ballymena & Provincial Intermediate League x2:

2021/22, 2025/26

McReynolds Cup x2:

2024/25, 2025/26

O’Gorman Cup:

2018/19

IFA Intermediate Cup;

Finalists 2024/25
