= Mark Glendinning =

Northern Irish footballer

Personal information
- Date of birth: 2 April 1970 (age 56)
- Place of birth: Belfast, Northern Ireland
- Position: Defender

Youth career
- Bangor U21

Senior career*
Years	Team	Apps	(Gls)
1987-1995	Bangor F.C.		
1995-2001	Glenavon F.C.		
2001-2009	Glentoran F.C.		
- * Club domestic league appearances and goals

Mark Glendinning (born 2 April 1970) is a retired Northern Irish footballer.

Glendinning started his career at Bangor, initially playing for their U21 squad before making his senior debut in 1987, and later moved on to Glenavon in 1995 and then to Glentoran in 2001. He retired after 8 years of football with Glentoran in 2009.

Glendinning has two sons who are also professional footballers. Reece currently plays for Carrick Rangers and Ross currently plays for Loughgall FC.
