= 1999–2000 Irish League Cup =

Coca-Cola League Cup

Tournament details
- Country: Northern Ireland
- Teams: 19

Final positions
- Champions: Linfield (6th win)
- Runners-up: Coleraine

Tournament statistics
- Matches played: 18
- Goals scored: 59 (3.28 per match)

The 1999–2000 Irish League Cup (known as the Coca-Cola League Cup for sponsorship reasons) was the 14th edition of the Irish League Cup, Northern Ireland's secondary football knock-out cup competition. It concluded on 18 April 2000 with the final.

Linfield were the defending champions after their fifth League Cup win last season; a 2–1 victory over Glentoran in the previous final. This season they won a record third successive League Cup with a 4–0 victory over Coleraine in the final to lift the cup for the sixth time overall. The 4–0 scoreline remains the joint largest margin of victory in a League Cup final to date, with the record being equalled in 2013.

Linfield's record of winning three consecutive League Cups was equalled by Cliftonville's three consecutive wins in 2012–13, 2013–14 and 2014–15. It was then broken when Cliftonville added a fourth consecutive win in 2015–16.

== Preliminary round ==
Team 1	Score	Team 2
Ballyclare Comrades	1–1 (3–2 p)	Dungannon Swifts
Carrick Rangers	1–3 (aet)	Limavady United
Institute	0–1	Armagh City
Omagh Town	2–0	Larne

== First round ==
Team 1	Score	Team 2
Armagh City	1–2	Limavady United
Ballymena United	2–4	Portadown
Cliftonville	5–2	Ards
Coleraine	3–1	Glenavon
Crusaders	1–1 (4–5 p)	Bangor
Glentoran	3–0	Omagh Town
Lisburn Distillery	2–0	Ballyclare Comrades
Newry Town	0–4	Linfield

== Quarter-finals ==
Team 1	Score	Team 2
Limavady United	3–1	Glentoran
Linfield	4–2	Bangor
Lisburn Distillery	2–2	Coleraine
Portadown	3–0	Cliftonville

=== Replay ===
Team 1	Score	Team 2
Lisburn Distillery	0–1	Coleraine

== Semi-finals ==
Team 1	Score	Team 2
Limavady United	0–1	Linfield
Portadown	0–2	Coleraine

== Final ==
18 April 2000

Coleraine	0 – 4	Linfield
	Report	Gorman 6'; Morgan 21'; Larmour 37'; McShane 86'

Windsor Park, Belfast
