= Magherafelt Sky Blues F.C. =

Association football club in Northern Ireland

Magherafelt Sky Blues
- Full name: Magherafelt Sky Blues Football Club
- Founded: 1970
- Ground: Spires Park, Magherafelt
- Manager: Brian Taylor
- League: North West Intermediate League
- 2017-18: Ballymena & Provincial Football League Premier Division, 7th

Magherafelt Sky Blues Football Club are an amateur football club from Magherafelt, County Londonderry, Northern Ireland. The club, founded in 1970, plays its home matches at Spires Park. Club colours are sky blue and navy. The current manager is Brian Taylor and Sean Monaghan. The club played in the Ballymena & Provincial Intermediate League until announcing their resignation from the league on the eve of the 2017–18 season. They now compete in the Coleraine & District Football League.

== History ==
The club was established by local footballers in 1970 who wanted a club that could appeal to both the Catholic and Protestant populations of the town. Their Sky Blues name and strip colour were taken from the Football League club Coventry City. They settled at their current home Spires Park, a playing field which had been locally known as "Stoney Park", in 2007.

They were members of the Northern Ireland Intermediate League until 2012 and had their best season in that competition in 2005–06 when they finished as runners-up. For the 2012–13 season, the club moved to the Ballymena & Provincial League. Honours won at intermediate level include two Northern Ireland Challenge Cup wins (2008–09 and 2009–10). The club reached the Boxing Day final of the Craig Memorial Cup in 2008 although they lost 3–0 to Limavady United.

The club first entered the Irish Cup, Northern Ireland's senior knock-out competition, in the 2004–05 season when they reached the third round before being eliminated by Moyola Park. They were eliminated by Killymoon Rangers the following season Newcastle in 2006–07, both in the first round. Bloomfield eliminated the Sky Blues in the first round for a third season running in 2007–08 although in the preliminary round they established a club record Irish Cup win, beating Dunaghy 8–2. 2008–09 saw a further first round elimination at the hands of Draperstown Celtic. The Sky Blues reached the third round in 2009–10, losing to Holywood and again in 2010–11 where they lost to Shankill United.

== Youth development ==
The club is noted for its youth development, with youth teams organised in six age groups by the club. In 2011 four of the six teams reached the league cup finals of their respective leagues. The CIS Mini Soccer Centre, where their youth teams train, was recognised by the Irish Football Association for its contributions to the local game in 2007.
