= Bessbrook United F.C. =

Bessbrook United
- Full name: Bessbrook United Football Club
- Nickname: The Brook
- Founded: 1900's (as Bessbrook Athletic / Bessbrook) 1990 (as Bessbrook United)
- Stadium: Orior Park
- Chairman: Paddy Duffy
- League: Mid-Ulster Football League

Bessbrook United Football Club, referred to as Bessbrook United, and also known as "The Brook", is an intermediate-level football club playing in the Mid-Ulster Football League in Northern Ireland. Bessbrook United was founded in 1990 as a phoenix club for the original Bessbrook, formed in the 1900s. which itself became Bessbrook Athletic following WWI. Following WWII, its name changed back to Bessbrook. The club, which is based in Bessbrook, Newry, County Armagh, has two men's senior teams, and a senior ladies team, Bessbrook United Ladies, who play in the NIWFA. They also have a boys and girls youth academy. Bessbrook are a member of the Mid-Ulster Football Association. The club's senior team plays in the Irish Cup.

Bessbrook United play their home games at Orior Park. Their home kit colours are red with black stripes.

== History ==
In the 1900s, Bessbrook Football Club was formed and joined the Mid Ulster League, winning the Mid Ulster Shield in 1912 and 1913.

Bessbrook was reformed in 1919 as Bessbrook Athletic after World War I. They were one of nine clubs that comprised a new local league in the same year, the Newry and District Football League. Bessbrook were the inaugural champions of the Newry and District Football League in the 1919–20 season.

Ireland international Eddie Carroll played for Bessbrook Athletics' junior side in 1920.

In 1931, Bessbrook Athletic reached the IFA Junior Cup final, and went on to left the trophy. They fell short on another occasion.

Following World War II, Bessbrook reformed back to its first name, Bessbrook Football Club, and had joined the Mid-Ulster Football League. They continued to play in the league until they were dissolved in the 1980s.

In 1990, Bessbrook United were formed as a phoenix club to the original football team, which was approved, admitted them into the Mid-Ulster Football League.

In the late 1990s, Bessbrook United achieved their biggest period of success, when they were Intermediate champions in 1999 and 2000, qualifying them for the NIFL Premier Intermediate League.

In the 1998–99 season, Bessbrook United beat Comber Rec 3–1 in the preliminary round of the Irish Cup, but faced a heady defeat, losing 6–0 to Killyleagh Youth.

In the 1999–2000 season, Bessbrook United reached the sixth round of the Irish Cup, when they were narrowly beaten 2–1 by Ballymena United. Despite the lose, Bessbrook United had a successful treble-winning season, winning the league, Marshall Cup and Premier Cup.

In 2006 and 2007 Bessbrook won the Mid Ulster Shield back-to-back.

In 2019, Bessbrook won the Gerald Kennedy Cup. In the same season, Bessbrook faced Junior Cup holders Enniskillen Rangers in the IFA Junior Cup semi-final and defeated them. However, the IFA had ruled that Bessbrook United played an ineligible player in the match, named as Conor Sloan. Therefore, Enniskillen Rangers were reinstated. Bessbrook had made an appeal against this decision to the IFA but were unsuccessful. The club put out a statement: "Regretfully we have received confirmation that our appeal against the IFA board overruling the Junior & Youth Cup Committee's decision that we “had no case to answer” has been dismissed. We have received no further information regarding the final,"

In April 2024, Bessbrook United beat West End Hibs in a penalty shoot-out following a 2–2 draw in the Foster Cup final to lift the trophy. They ended the season with a cup double by winning MUFL Division 2.

== Honours ==
- Irish Football Association
  - IFA Junior Cup
    - 1930-1931, runners up - 2006/07, 2010/11
- Mid-Ulster Football League
  - Intermediate A
    - 1998/99, 1999/00
  - Division 2
    - 2023/24
  - Division 3
    - 1998/99 reserves
  - Mid Ulster Cup
    - Runners up - 1951/52, 1954/55, 1955/56
  - Mid Ulster Shield
    - 1911/12, 1912/13, 2005/06, 2006/07
  - Gerald Kennedy Cup
    - 2010, 2019
  - Foster Cup
    - 2023/24
  - Marshall Cup
    - 1998/99, 1999/00
  - Premier Cup
    - 1999/00
- Newry and District Football League
  - Newry and District Senior League
    - 1919/20
- Carbane Football League
  - AOH Cup
    - 2024, 2025
