= Jeff Spiers =

Northern Irish footballer and coach

Jeff Spiers (born 2 May 1967) is a Northern Irish football coach and former player. A defender, Spiers started out with Barn United before signing for Linfield, where he won virtually every domestic honour possible, before signing for Glenavon, Bangor, and Crusaders, where he was appointed captain and was instrumental in the Crues rise into the Premier League as they won almost all intermediate trophies. Appointed at the start of the 2007–08 season, Jeff was appointed manager of Crusaders Reserves team. He was assistant manager of the first team at the club to Stephen Baxter until his departure in 2024.
