= Draperstown Celtic F.C. =

Association football club in Northern Ireland

Draperstown Celtic
- Full name: Draperstown Celtic Football Club
- Nickname(s): DC
- Founded: 1968
- Ground: Cahore Playing Fields
- Chairman: Paul McCallion
- Manager: John Glass
Home colours

Draperstown Celtic is a football club from the village of Draperstown, Northern Ireland. The club, founded in 1968, plays its home matches at Cahore Playing Fields.

Draperstown Celtic were awarded the IFA Grassroots Club Of The Year Award for 2020 as well as the Inclusivity Award

Club colours Home Kit - Green and white hoops. Away Kit - Black with green and gold vertical stripes. DC Diamonds - Black with pink and white vertical stripes.

The current principle club sponsor is Ballinascreen Credit Union with Capital Dynamics and Crockandun Windfarm Ltd also appearing on the kits

The clubs mental health partner is S.T.E.P.S

As of 2020 / 21 season Draperstown Celtic have both male and female teams at various ages from U6 right up to Seniors.

== Honours ==
=== Junior honours ===
- North West Junior Division 2 : Champions 2014/2015
- North West Junior Division 1 : Champions 2015/2016

=== Intermediate honours ===
- Northern Ireland Intermediate League: 1
  - 2007/08
- NI Intermediate League Cup : 2 (Runners-up: 1)
  - 2004 2010 (2000)
- North West Division 1: 4 (Runners Up: 3)
  - 1973; 1988; 1992; 1995 (1983; 1987; 1990)
- North West Junior Cup: 1
  - 1990
- Tobermore Cup: 1
  - 1971
- South Derry League: 1
  - 1979
- South Derry Challenge Cup: 1
  - 1979
- South Derry League Cup: 1
  - 1979
- Top Four Cup: 1
  - 1979
- North West Supplementary Cup: 1
  - 1992
- McGrogan Cup: 1 (Runners Up: 1)
  - 2007 (2002)
- Eamon Kelly Memorial Cup : 1
  - 2001

== Current squad ==
As of Sun 25 January 2009

Note: Flags indicate national team as defined under FIFA eligibility rules; some limited exceptions apply. Players may hold more than one non-FIFA nationality.

No.	Pos.	Nation	Player
