= Bangor Amateurs F.C. =

Association football club in Northern Ireland

Bangor Amateurs
- Full name: Bangor Amateurs Football Club
- Nickname(s): AMS
- Founded: 1969
- Ground: Ballyvarnet, Clandeboye, Bangor
- Chairman: Andrew Montgomery
- League: NAFL Division 1B

Bangor Amateurs Football Club is a Northern Irish, intermediate football club playing in Division 1B of the Northern Amateur Football League. The club is based in Bangor, County Down, and was formed in 1969. The club plays in the Irish Cup.

== Honours ==
=== Intermediate honours ===
- Clarence Cup: 1
  - 2002–03
