= Shankill United F.C. =

Association football club in Northern Ireland

Shankill United
- Full name: Shankill United Football Club
- Founded: 1971
- Ground: Hammer Playing Fields, Belfast
- League: NAFL Premier Division
- 2017–18: NAFL Premier Division, 10th
- Website: https://shankillunitedfc.org.uk
Away colours

Shankill United Football Club is a Northern Irish, intermediate football club playing in the Premier Division of the Northern Amateur Football League. They play their home matches at the Hammer pitch on Agnes Street in the Shankill area of Belfast although for the 2012–13 season they relocated to the Inverary Park ground in the east of the city. The club was founded in 1971 as Harland & Wolff Rec., changing its name to Harland & Wolff Sports in 1984. In 2007, it adopted its present name.

== Honours ==
=== Intermediate honours ===
- Northern Amateur Football League: Premier
  - 1990–91
- Northern Amateur Football League: 1A
  - 1993–94
- Northern Amateur Football League: 1B
  - 2008–09
- Clarence Cup: 3
  - 1986–87, 1988–89, 1991–92

Junior Honours

- Northern Amateur Football League: 2A
  - 2007–08
- IFA Junior Shield: Junior Shield
  - 2004–05

== Notable people ==
- Jamie Marks
- Robbie Morris
