= Gerry Mullan (footballer) =

Northern Irish footballer

Personal information
- Place of birth: Limavady, Northern Ireland
- Position: Striker

Youth career
- 1973–1974: Newtown Youth
- 1975–1976: Coolagh Celtic
- 1976–1978: Limavady United

Senior career*
Years	Team	Apps	(Gls)
1978–1980	Ballymena United		
1980–1981	Everton	0	(0)
1981–1988	Glentoran		
1988–1990	Coleraine		
1990–199?	Roe Valley		

International career
1983	Northern Ireland	4	(0)
- * Club domestic league appearances and goals

Gerry Mullan is a Northern Ireland international footballer who played as a striker. At club level, he featured for Ballymena United, Everton, Glentoran and Coleraine.

== Career ==
Mullan was born in Limavady. When Ronnie McFall signed Mullan for Glentoran in 1981 from Everton, he became the most expensive Irish League player, at £30,000. He scored 110 goals for Glentoran, with his season's best being 27.

Mullan was capped four times for Northern Ireland in 1983.

== Honours ==
Ballymena United

- County Antrim Shield: 1980
- Ulster Cup: 1980-81

Glentoran

- Irish League: 1988
- Irish Cup: 1983, 1985, 1986, 1987, 1988
- Gold Cup: 1987
- Ulster Cup: 1983, 1984
- County Antrim Chalice: 1988
