= Dromore Amateurs F.C. =

Association football club in Northern Ireland

Dromore Amateurs
- Full name: Dromore Amateurs Football Club
- Nickname: The Amateurs
- Founded: 1958
- Ground: Nelson Park
- Capacity: 1,000
- Chairman: Russell Ward
- Manager: Chris Shields
- League: Mid-Ulster Football League Intermediate B
- Website: http://www.thenafl.co.uk/teams/id/58

Dromore Amateurs Football Club, referred to simply as Dromore, is a Northern Irish, intermediate football club playing in the Intermediate B Division of the Mid-Ulster Football League. The club had played in Division 1C of the Northern Amateur Football League before switching in 2017. The club is based in Dromore, County Down, and was formed in 1958 and played at Mountview Park until 1998 when it moved to Ferris Park. The club will now start the 2025/26 season at their new ground Nelson Park. Club colours are amber and black.

The club, which forms part of the Mid-Ulster Football Association, play in the Irish Cup.
