= University of Ulster at Coleraine F.C. =

Association football club in Northern Ireland

UUC
- Full name: University of Ulster at Coleraine Football Club
- Dissolved: 1983
- Ground: UUC, Coleraine
- League: Irish League 'B' Division

UUC Football Club (University of Ulster at Coleraine Football Club), originally called NUU (New University of Ulster was a Northern Irish, intermediate football club that played in the B Division of the Irish League from 1975 to 1983. The club was connected to the University of Ulster and was based in Coleraine. The club played in the Irish Cup in 1982–83.
