= Ballymacash Rangers F.C. =

Association football club in Northern Ireland

- Full name: Ballymacash Rangers Football Club
- Nickname: The Cash
- Founded: 1984
- Ground: The Bluebell Stadium; Lisburn, County Antrim
- Manager: Gary Hamilton
- League: NCL Premier
- 2025–26: NIFL Premier Intermediate League, 6th of 14
Home colours

Ballymacash Rangers Football Club is an intermediate-level football club who play in the NCL Premier. The club is based in the Lisburn area and play their home games at The Bluebell Stadium.

== History ==
Ballymacash Rangers won the top tier (Intermediate A) of the Mid-Ulster Football League in the 2003/04 season. Following this the club had a trophy barren spell up until the 2012/13 season when following a relegation from Intermediate A, the club found themselves in Intermediate B. A successful 2012/13 campaign saw them lift the Intermediate B title which was followed up by winning the Mid-Ulster Football League Alan Wilson Cup to make it a double winning season.

Ballymacash Rangers went the entire calendar year of 2014 without defeat in a league fixture, winning all of their league games bar two. The club never won the Mid-Ulster Football League Intermediate A in either season that 2014 covered, coming second in 2013/14 and third in 2014/15.

In 2019, the club announced their aspirations to gain promotion to the Northern Ireland Football League alongside plans to complete a million pound renovation of The Bluebell Stadium, the ground where Ballymacash play their home games.

In 2020, the club completed the first phase of their ground renovavations as they opened a state of the art full sized 3G pitch with floodlights. This was a community funded project. Future phases are proposed to include developing a new social club with onsite gym and expanding car parking facilities. In July 2021, the club finished work on its first ever pitchside stand, with the 100-seater structure sitting behind the goal at the Drumard Grange end.

Manager Lee Forsythe won Intermediate A at his first attempt, winning it in the 2021/22 season. His Ballymacash side played thirty league games, winning twenty-five, drawing four and losing just once. They finished the season with 126 goals scored and only 24 conceded. The 2021/22 season Mid-Ulster Football League also saw Ballymacash's 1st team, Reserves and Swifts teams all winning their respective leagues. This was the first time in Mid-Ulster Football League history that one club had won three league titles in the same season.

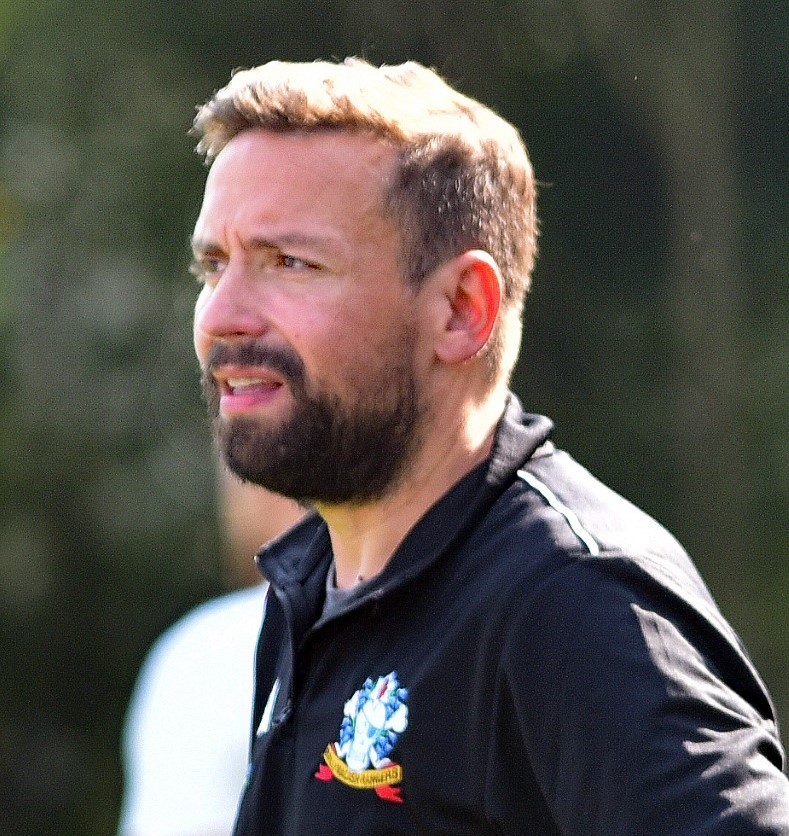
Lee Forsythe, former manager of Ballymacash Rangers

On Tuesday 23 August 2022, Ballymacash made history when they won their first ever Northern Ireland Football League fixture, winning 3–0 away to Portstewart F.C. in the Premier Intermediate League.

Another piece of history was made at The Bluebell Stadium on Tuesday 25 October 2022, as Ballymacash's home game against Lisburn Distillery F.C. was the Northern Ireland Football League's first ever live streamed YouTube game. The stream had over 8000 views, with the match itself finishing in a 2–2 draw.

Following the appointment of former Northern Ireland international Gary Hamilton (footballer, born 1980) in April 2025, Hamilton made history by winning the 2025/26 Steel and Sons Cup on 25th December 2025. His Ballymacash Rangers side defeated Holywood FC on penalties (4-2) after the game finished 1-1. This was the first time the club had won the prestigious competition.

== Promotion ==
Ballymacash Rangers gained promotion to the third tier of Northern Irish football for the first time in their history in May 2022. Having won the Mid-Ulster Football League Intermediate A division, they were eligible for a promotion playoff to try and reach the NIFL Premier Intermediate League. The only other eligible league winner was St James' Swifts F.C. who won the Ballymena & Provincial Football League, which meant Ballymacash had to meet St James in a two legged playoff for promotion.

The 1st leg of the playoff between Ballymacash and St James took place on Tuesday 17 May 2022 at The Bluebell Stadium, which ended 3–0 to Ballymacash Rangers.

The 2nd leg took place on Saturday 21 May 2022 at Donegal Celtic Park. The game finished 2-2, which gave Ballymacash Rangers a 5-2 aggregate victory, securing their place in the NIFL Premier Intermediate League.

== Management history ==
Michael Gault was appointed manager in June 2019. He resigned from his managerial role on 3 October 2020 to take up a role at Linfield.

On 11 October 2020, Ballymacash appointed former Ards Rangers and Knockbreda manager Lee Forsythe as new manager..

In April 2025, Ballymacash Rangers appointed former Northern Ireland international Gary Hamilton (footballer, born 1980) as new 1st team manager.

== Intermediate honours ==
Intermediate level of senior football

Since becoming an Intermediate level club, Ballymacash Rangers have won seven Intermediate honours:

- Steel & Sons Cup: 1
  - 2025-26
- Mid-Ulster Football League - Intermediate A : 2
  - 2003–04
  - 2021-22
- Mid-Ulster Football League - Intermediate B : 2
  - 1997-98
  - 2012-13
- Mid-Ulster Football League - Alan Wilson Cup : 2
  - 1997-98
  - 2012-13

== Junior honours ==
Junior level of senior football (non-Intermediate)

Prior to becoming an Intermediate level club at 1st team level, the Cash had success at Junior level from their founding in 1984. In the modern day, Ballymacash have a Reserve (2nds) and Swifts (3rds) team who continue to play at Junior level:

- Mid-Ulster Football League - Reserve Championship: 1
  - 2021/22
- Mid-Ulster Football League - Reserve Division One: 1
  - 2005/06
- Mid-Ulster Football League - Reserve Division Four: 1
  - 2021/22
- Mid-Ulster Football League - Mid Ulster League Cup: 1
  - 2013/14
- Mid-Ulster Football League - Wilmor Johnston Cup: 1
  - 2021/22
- South-Antrim Football League - Ironside Cup: 1
  - 2020/21
- South-Antrim Football League - Supplementary Cup: 1
  - 2020/21

== Women's football ==
In December 2020, Ballymacash Rangers welcomed a senior women's team into the club for the first time in their history. They are known as "Ballymacash Rangers Ladies" and amalgamated into the club from Ballymacash Young Ladies, another local side in the area.

They were in NIWFA Division One when they joined the club for the 2021 season, and with a positive first season in that division, they were able to gain promotion to the NIWFA Championship for the 2022 season. The NIWFA Championship is the top tier of NIWFA football. Only one division in women's football ranks higher in Northern Ireland, which is the Northern Ireland Football League Women's Premiership.

== Notable players ==
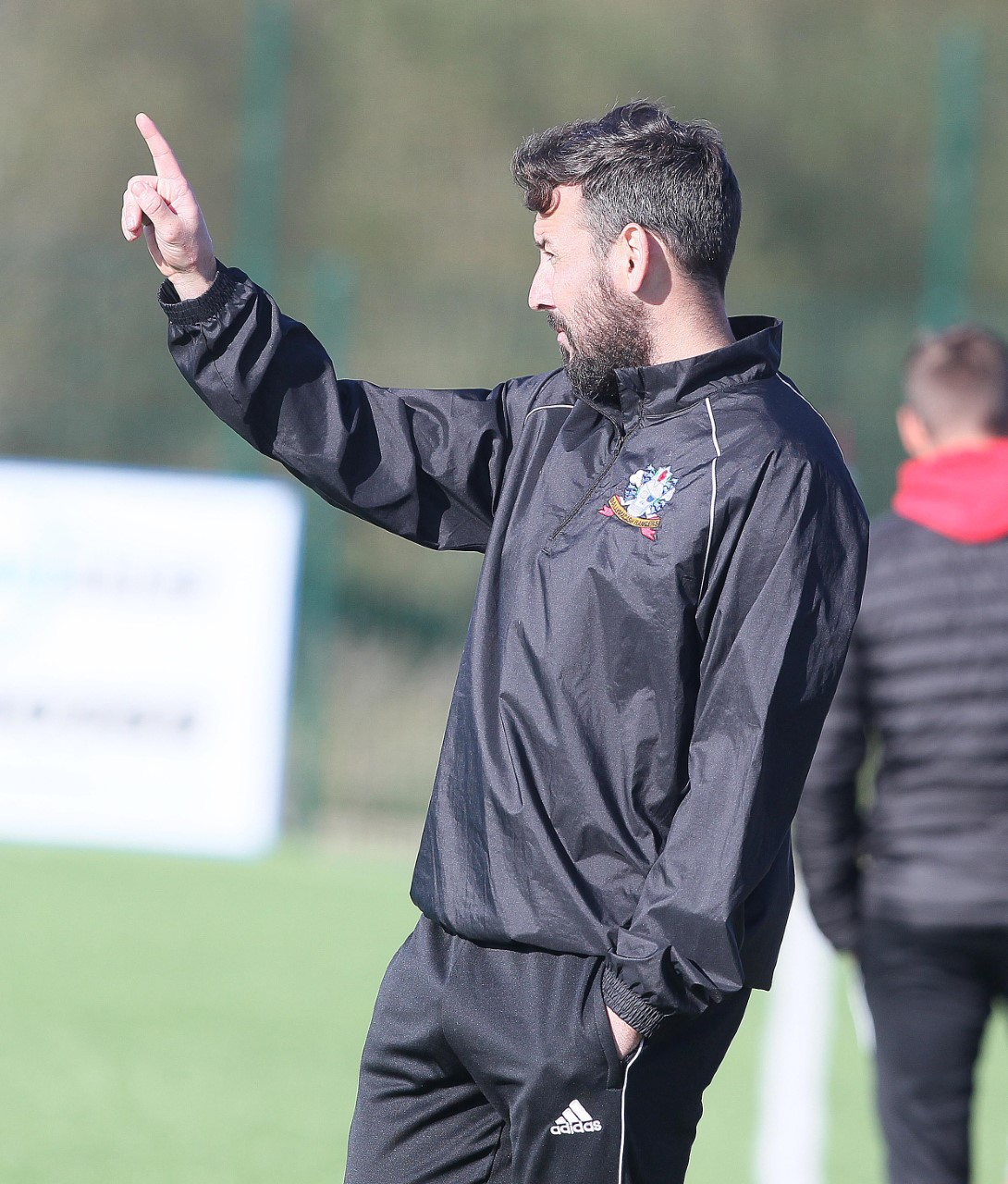
Michael Gault, ex Linfield, Portadown and Crusaders midfielder, who managed Ballymacash Rangers from 2019 to 2020

Northern Ireland Senior Internationals

- Michael Gault was appointed player manager of Ballymacash Rangers in July 2019. Gault has received one full international cap for Northern Ireland
- Rory Patterson joined Ballymacash Rangers in September 2019 following his release from Crusaders. Patterson has received five full international caps for Northern Ireland

Northern Ireland U21 Internationals

- David Armstrong (footballer, born 1987) joined Ballymacash Rangers in July 2019. Armstrong previously played for Heart of Midlothian, Linfield and Dungannon Swifts. He has received one cap for the Northern Ireland U21 side

== League position ==
All standings are taken from the Mid-Ulster Football League archive section which dates back to 2008/09 season

- 2008/09 - Intermediate A - 6th
- 2009/10 - Intermediate A - 12th
- 2010/11 - Intermediate B - 5th
- 2011/12 - Intermediate B - 5th
- 2012/13 - Intermediate B - 1st
- 2013/14 - Intermediate A - 3rd
- 2014/15 - Intermediate A - 2nd
- 2015/16 - Intermediate A - 8th
- 2016/17 - Intermediate A - 11th
- 2017/18 - Intermediate A - 10th
- 2018/19 - Intermediate A - 9th
- 2019/20 - Intermediate A - 2nd*
- 2020/21 - SEASON NULL & VOID**
- 2021/22 - Intermediate A - 1st
  - 2019/20 season was cut short due to COVID-19 pandemic and the table was determined by a points-per-game formula
  - 2020/21 season was declared null and void due to COVID-19 lockdowns meaning the league was unplayable
