= Cookstown United F.C. =

Association football club in Northern Ireland

Cookstown United
- Full name: Cookstown United Football Club
- Dissolved: 2002
- Ground: Cookstown
- League: Irish League 'B' Division

Cookstown United Football Club was a Northern Irish, intermediate football club that played in the B Division of the Irish League from 1990 to 2001. The club folded during the 2001–02 season. The club played in the Irish Cup in 1982–83.
