= Dundela F.C. =

Association football club in Northern Ireland

Coordinates: 54.599486°N 5.878361°W

Dundela
- Full name: Dundela Football Club
- Nickname: The Duns
- Founded: 1895
- Ground: Wilgar Park, Belfast
- Capacity: 1,200
- Manager: Clifford Adams
- League: NIFL Championship
- 2025–26: NIFL Championship, 11th of 12
Home colours	Away colours

Dundela Football Club, nicknamed "The Duns" is a semi-professional, Northern Irish football club from Belfast, currently playing in the NIFL Championship, and plays its home matches at Wilgar Park. The club's colours are green and white. The home kit has green shirts, green shorts and green socks, whilst the away kit is all red.

== History ==
Dundela Football Club was formed in 1895 from employees of a local dairy owned by the Agnew family and members of a local harriers' club. Wilgar Park has been the home to the club since 1900. The park lies in the heartland of east Belfast, in a suburb named Strandtown. Its capacity is approximately 1,200. The venue is nicknamed "The Hen Run".

The club's greatest achievement to date came in April 1955, when it defeated Glenavon by three goals to nil at Windsor Park, Belfast in the final of the Irish Cup. It was the first time a club from the Irish Alliance won the competition.

The club's darkest hour occurred on 25 August 1995, when team captain, Michael Goddard died during a game at Stangmore Park, home of Dungannon Swifts, after being struck on the chest with the ball.

Dundela's local rivals are Harland & Wolff Welders.

Dundela FC emerged victorious in the 2017/18 NIFL Premier Intermediate League, securing a notable accomplishment in the club's history.

In the subsequent 2018/19 NIFL Championship campaign, Dundela FC secured a commendable 4th-place finish. The Belfast-based football club continued to exhibit competitive prowess as it navigated the challenges of the Championship.

In the curtailed 2019/20 season The Duns finished sixth. The following season was cancelled due to the global pandemic. NIFL Championship football returned after the pandemic in the 2021/22 campaign in which Dundela finished 8th.

In the 2022/23 campaign, Dundela exhibited improvement, climbing up the table to achieve 4th place.

In April 2023, Dundela winger Aodhan Gillen died in a car accident, at the age of 22.

In 2023, the club appointed former player Stephen Gourley as manager, following the departure of Paul Harbinson.

The following season, the club would perform incredibly well, leading the NIFL Championship for much of the season, however were unable to be promoted due to issues with the pitch dimensions at Wilgar Park, an issue which will not be rectified in the near future. Such an issue emphasized the great need for stadia improvement within Northern Ireland.

== Current squad ==
Note: Flags indicate national team as defined under FIFA eligibility rules; some limited exceptions apply. Players may hold more than one non-FIFA nationality.

No.	Pos.	Nation	Player
1	GK	NIR	Gerard Walker
5	DF	NIR	Kyle Owens
12	DF	NIR	James McCarthy
25	DF	NIR	Michael Kerr
4	DF	NIR	Owen McConville
6	MF	NIR	Charlie Dornan
14	MF	NIR	Xander Lynn
17		NIR	Josh Andrews

No.	Pos.	Nation	Player
11	MF	NIR	Oisin Barr
24	MF	NIR	Gary Donnelly
10	MF	NIR	Eoghan McCawl
8	MF	NIR	Andy Hall
7	FW	NIR	Kenzie Beattie
9	FW	NIR	Matthew Ferguson
22	FW	ENG	Benny Igiehon
18	FW	NIR	Ewan Kelly
19	FW	NIR	Darius Roohi

== Dundela Social Club ==
Supporters meet at the Dundela Social Club, also known as the Duns Club.

The Dundela Dart team hold their home games at the social club. They joined the Belfast & District darts league in 1977. They won the First Division in 1988.

== Honours ==
=== Senior honours ===
- Irish Cup: 1
  - 1954–55

=== Intermediate honours ===
- Irish League B Division (tier 2): 9 (1 shared)
  - 1967–68, 1976–77 (shared), 1981–82, 1985–86, 1987–88, 1989–90, 1990–91, 1991–92, 1993–94
- Second Division/NIFL Premier Intermediate League (tier 3): 3
  - 1999–00, 2000–01, 2017–18
- Irish Intermediate League: 5
  - 1921–22, 1944–45, 1946–47, 1949–50, 1950–51
- Irish Intermediate Cup: 10
  - 1946–47, 1954–55, 1965–66, 1974–75, 1983–84, 1988–89, 1992–93, 1998–99, 1999–00, 2000–01
- George Wilson Cup: 4
  - 1964–65, 1967–68, 1971–72, 1974–75
- Steel & Sons Cup: 10
  - 1945–46, 1963–64, 1980–81, 1982–83, 1987–88, 1988–89, 1990–91, 1999–00, 2007–08, 2013–14
- B Division Knock-out Cup: 4
  - 1987–88, 1990–91, 1991–92, 1994–95
- McElroy Cup: 1
  - 1945–46 (shared)

== Notable former players ==
- (Northern Ireland) David Lyner
- (Northern Ireland) Eric McMordie
- (Northern Ireland) Billy Caskey
- (Northern Ireland) Matty Burrows
- (Northern Ireland) Jackie Vernon
