= 2006–07 Irish Cup =

Tournament details
- Country: Northern Ireland
- Teams: 114

Final positions
- Champions: Linfield (38th win)
- Runners-up: Dungannon Swifts

Tournament statistics
- Matches played: 117
- Goals scored: 456 (3.9 per match)

The 2006–07 Irish Cup was the 127th edition of the Irish Cup, Northern Ireland's premier football knock-out cup competition. It concluded on 5 May 2007 with the final.

Linfield were the defending champions, winning their 37th Irish Cup last season after a 2–1 win over archrivals Glentoran in the 2006 final. They successfully defended the cup by defeating Dungannon Swifts 3–2 on penalties, when the final ended 2–2 after extra time. This was the first, and to date only Irish Cup final ever to be decided by a penalty shootout.

== Results ==
=== First preliminary round ===
Team 1	Score	Team 2
Abbey Villa	2–1	Islandmagee
Bourneview Young Men	3–0	Saintfield United
Civil Service	3–0	AFC Craigavon
Grove United	2–1	Warrenpoint Town
Killymoon Rangers	0–4	Malachians
Magherafelt Sky Blues	3–0	Lurgan Town Boys

=== Second preliminary round ===
Team 1	Score	Team 2
Abbey Villa	1–2	Downpatrick
Albert Foundry	2–1	Newington Youth
Ballymacash Rangers	0–1	Laurelvale
Bangor Amateurs	0–1	Bryansburn Rangers
Barn United	2–4	Ballynahinch United
Blackers Mill	5–1	Seagoe
Bloomfield	9–1	Rasharkin United
Bourneview Young Men	3–2	Churchill United
Coleraine Crusaders	2–7	Dunaghy
Donard Hospital	4–1	Shorts
Downshire Young Men	2–1	Portglenone
Draperstown Celtic	2–4	Larne Tech Old Boys
Dromore Amateurs	0–5	Glebe Rangers
Dungiven Celtic	4–3	Sirocco Works
Grove United	2–0	Dergview
Hanover	2–1	UUC
Lisburn Rangers	4–2	Orangefield Old Boys
Lower Maze	0–3	Holywood
Magherafelt Sky Blues	2–1	Newbuildings United
Malachians	2–0	Dundonald
Markethill Swifts	4–0	Civil Service
Mountnorris	4–3	Portadown BBOB
Nortel	6–2	Desertmartin
Roe Valley	1–2	Fivemiletown United
Rosario Youth	4–1	Raceview
Sport & Leisure Swifts	1–2	Newcastle
Strabane	1–2	Dunmurry Young Men
Wellington Recreation	3–0	Tandragee Rovers

=== First round ===
Team 1	Score	Team 2
Albert Foundry	5–0	Fivemiletown United
Ballynahinch United	4–0	Dunaghy
Blackers Mill	6–2	Mountnorris
Bloomfield	2–4	Laurelvale
Bryansburn Rangers	2–1	Malachians
Downpatrick	2–1	Nortel
Downshire Young Men	2–1	Donard Hospital
Dungiven Celtic	5–2	Bourneview Young Men
Glebe Rangers	4–0	Hanover
Grove United	4–1	Larne Tech Old Boys
Lisburn Rangers	3–4	Holywood
Magherafelt Sky Blues	1–2	Newcastle
Markethill Swifts	0–1	Rosario Youth
Wellington Recreation	4–1	Dunmurry Young Men

=== Second round ===
Team 1	Score	Team 2
Ballynahinch United	3–0	Holywood
Downpatrick	2–3	Grove United
Downshire Young Men	4–1	Blackers Mill
Glebe Rangers	3–4	Dungiven Celtic
Laurelvale	3–1	Albert Foundry
Newcastle	3–2	Bryansburn Rangers
Rosario Youth	1–0	Wellington Recreation

=== Third round ===
Team 1	Score	Team 2
Annagh United	1–2	Dungiven Celtic
Ards Rangers	3–0	Ballynahinch United
Ballinamallard United	2–3	Killyleagh Youth
Ballymoney United	2–0	Moyola Park
Brantwood	2–0	Crumlin United
Coagh United	6–0	Downshire Young Men
Comber Recreation	4–2	Dunmurry Recreation
Grove United	0–2	Harland & Wolff Welders
Dromara Village	4–1	Queen's University
Kilmore Recreation	0–1	Dundela
Laurelvale	4–0	Crewe United
Lurgan Celtic	3–0	1st Bangor Old Boys
PSNI	1–1 (3–2p)	Chimney Corner
Rathfriland Rangers	0–2	Oxford United Stars
Rosario Youth	1–1 (3–2p)	East Belfast
Wakehurst	2–0	Drumaness Mills
Portstewart	2–4	Banbridge Town
Trojans	1–3	Newcastle

=== Fourth round ===
Team 1	Score	Team 2
Brantwood	3–5	PSNI
Coagh United	2–1	Wakehurst
Comber Recreation	4–1	Ards Rangers
Dromara Village	2–3	Ballymoney United
Harland & Wolff Welders	2–0	Newcastle
Killyleagh Youth	0–3	Dundela
Laurelvale	3–0	Dungiven Celtic
Lurgan Celtic	1–0	Rosario Youth
Oxford United Stars	4–4 (6–5p)	Banbridge Town

=== Fifth round ===
Team 1	Score	Team 2
Ards	1–1	Dundela
Armagh City	2–1	Institute
Ballymena United	1–0	Harland & Wolff Welders
Coleraine	1–2	Lisburn Distillery
Comber Recreation	0–0	Laurelvale
Crusaders	3–1	Lurgan Celtic
Dungannon Swifts	7–1	Coagh United
Glenavon	1–0	PSNI
Glentoran	2–1	Ballymoney United
Larne	2–4	Cliftonville
Limavady United	4–2	Carrick Rangers
Linfield	3–0	Oxford United Stars
Loughgall	2–1	Ballyclare Comrades
Newry City	4–0	Ballynure Old Boys
Portadown	6–1	Bangor
Tobermore United	2–2	Donegal Celtic

==== Replays ====
Team 1	Score	Team 2
Ards	2–1	Dundela
Comber Recreation	2–1	Laurelvale
Donegal Celtic	2–0	Tobermore United

=== Sixth round ===
Team 1	Score	Team 2
Ards	0–5	Linfield
Ballymena United	1–0	Comber Recreation
Cliftonville	2–0	Donegal Celtic
Dungannon Swifts	2–1	Newry City
Glentoran	2–3	Portadown
Limavady United	0–1	Crusaders
Lisburn Distillery	4–1	Glenavon
Loughgall	1–3	Armagh City

=== Quarter-finals ===
Team 1	Score	Team 2
Dungannon Swifts	2–0	Armagh City
Ballymena United	1–1	Linfield
Cliftonville	3–1	Portadown
Lisburn Distillery	4–1	Crusaders

==== Replay ====
Team 1	Score	Team 2
Linfield	4–2	Ballymena United

=== Semi-finals ===
Team 1	Score	Team 2
Cliftonville	0–0 (4–5p)	Dungannon Swifts
Lisburn Distillery	1–4 (aet)	Linfield

=== Final ===
5 May 2007

Linfield	2 – 2 (a.e.t.)	Dungannon Swifts
Dickson 3'; Ferguson 37'	Report	Hamill 17'; McAree 40'
Penalties
Ervin (penalty missed); Stewart (penalty missed); Ferguson (penalty scored); Dickson (penalty scored); McShane (penalty scored)	3 – 2	(penalty missed) Hamill; (penalty missed) Everaldo; (penalty scored) Montgomery; (penalty scored) McAree; (penalty missed) McAllister

Windsor Park, Belfast
Attendance: 7,600
Referee: Mark Courtney (Cookstown)
