= 2015–16 Northern Ireland Football League =

Northern Ireland Football League
- Season: 2015–16

The 2015–16 Northern Ireland Football League is the third season of Northern Ireland's national football league running independently as the Northern Ireland Football League, consisting of the top three levels of the national league system, namely: the Premiership, Championship 1, and Championship 2. It is also the 115th season of Irish league football overall. The season began on 8 August 2015 and will conclude in May 2016.

Crusaders are the defending champions, after securing last season's title for the fifth time in the club's history on 18 April 2015 – their first title since the 1996–97 season.

Four clubs will be relegated out of the Northern Ireland Football League at the end of the season, as the national league system reduces in size to 36 clubs – three tiers of 12 clubs.

== Promotion and relegation ==
Promoted from Championship 1 to the Premiership

- Carrick Rangers (1st in NIFL Championship 1)

Relegated from the Premiership to Championship 1

- Institute (12th in NIFL Premiership)

Promoted from Championship 2 to Championship 1

- Lurgan Celtic (1st in Championship 2)
- Annagh United (2nd in Championship 2)

Relegated from Championship 1 to Championship 2

- PSNI (13th in Championship 1)
- Dundela (14th in Championship 1)

Relegated from Championship 2 to Level 4 Regional League

- Ballymoney United (15th in Championship 2)

== League tables ==
=== Premiership ===
Pos	Team	Pld	W	D	L	GF	GA	GD	Pts	Qualification or relegation (Note: Teams played each other three times (33 matches), before the league was split into two groups (the top six and the bottom six) for the last five matches.)
1	Crusaders (C)	38	28	7	3	79	28	+51	91	Qualification for the Champions League second qualifying round
2	Linfield	38	26	5	7	91	35	+56	83	Qualification for the Europa League first qualifying round (Note: Glenavon qualified for the Europa League first qualifying round by winning the 2015–16 Irish Cup.)
3	Glenavon	38	20	9	9	72	40	+32	69	Qualification for the Europa League first qualifying round
4	Cliftonville (O)	38	18	10	10	58	53	+5	64	Qualification for the Europa League play-offs (Note: Cliftonville qualified for the Europa League first qualifying round by winning the Europa League play-offs.)
5	Coleraine	38	18	4	16	47	46	+1	58	Qualification for the Europa League play-offs
6	Glentoran	38	15	7	16	46	55	−9	52	Qualification for the Europa League play-offs
7	Dungannon Swifts (Note: Dungannon Swifts were ineligible for the Europa League play-offs, as they did not apply for a UEFA licence.)	38	12	7	19	51	66	−15	43	
8	Ballymena United	38	11	7	20	57	81	−24	40	
9	Portadown	38	11	5	22	43	67	−24	38	
10	Carrick Rangers	38	8	11	19	43	68	−25	35	
11	Ballinamallard United (O)	38	9	7	22	39	59	−20	34	Qualification for the relegation play-off
12	Warrenpoint Town (R)	38	9	7	22	45	73	−28	34	Relegation to the NIFL Championship

Source: RSSSF
Rules for classification: 1) Points; 2) Goal difference; 3) Goals scored; 4) Head-to-head points; 5) Head-to-head goal difference; 6) Drawing of lots.
(C) Champions; (O) Play-off winners; (R) Relegated

=== Championship 1 ===
Pos	Team	Pld	W	D	L	GF	GA	GD	Pts	Qualification or relegation (Note: Teams played each other twice (once at home and once away) for a total of 26 matches.)
1	Ards (C, P)	26	17	3	6	59	35	+24	54	Promotion to the NIFL Premiership
2	Harland & Wolff Welders (Note: Harland & Wolff Welders, Armagh City and Knockbreda did not apply for the Promotion Licence required for promotion to the Premiership. As a result, they were ineligible for the promotion play-off.)	26	15	6	5	54	28	+26	51	
3	Armagh City	26	13	5	8	64	36	+28	44	
4	Knockbreda	26	12	7	7	48	32	+16	43	
5	Institute	26	12	6	8	40	20	+20	42	Qualification for the promotion play-off (Note: As the highest-ranked Championship 1 club outside the top two to successfully attain a Promotion Licence, Institute qualified for the promotion play-off against the 11th-placed Premiership club.)
6	Larne	26	12	6	8	64	45	+19	42	
7	Lurgan Celtic	26	11	6	9	40	40	0	39	
8	Ballyclare Comrades	26	9	10	7	44	40	+4	37	
9	Loughgall	26	10	6	10	45	54	−9	36	
10	Bangor (R)	26	10	5	11	44	40	+4	35	Demotion to the NIFL Premier Intermediate League (Note: Bangor were demoted to the third tier as their application for the mandatory second tier Championship Licence was refused. As a result, the highest-ranked Championship 2 club to successfully attain the licence (PSNI) was automatically promoted to replace Bangor in the second tier.)
11	Dergview	26	9	8	9	41	40	+1	35	
12	Annagh United (Note: Limavady United (in Championship 2) applied for the mandatory second tier 'Championship Licence' but were refused. As a result, the 12th-placed Championship 1 club was reprieved from relegation.)	26	7	6	13	37	57	−20	27	
13	Donegal Celtic (R)	26	2	4	20	34	80	−46	10	Relegation to the NIFL Premier Intermediate League
14	Lisburn Distillery (R)	26	2	4	20	18	85	−67	10	Relegation to the NIFL Premier Intermediate League

Source: Northern Ireland Football League, Soccerway
Rules for classification: 1) Points; 2) Goal difference; 3) Goals scored; 4) Head-to-head points; 5) Head-to-head goal difference; 6) Drawing of lots.
(C) Champions; (P) Promoted; (R) Relegated

=== Championship 2 ===
Pos	Team	Pld	W	D	L	GF	GA	GD	Pts	Qualification or relegation (Note: Teams play each other twice (once at home and once away) for a total of 26 matches.)
1	Limavady United (Note: Limavady United were ineligible for promotion as their application for the mandatory second tier licence was refused.) (C)	26	18	5	3	66	27	+39	59	
2	PSNI (P)	26	18	5	3	59	23	+36	59	Promotion to the NIFL Championship (Note: Bangor (in Championship 1) were demoted to the third tier as they failed to apply for the mandatory second tier 'Championship Licence'. As a result, PSNI, the highest-ranked Championship 2 club to successfully attain the licence was automatically promoted to replace Bangor in the second tier.)
3	Sport & Leisure Swifts	26	13	8	5	59	28	+31	47	
4	Tobermore United	26	13	5	8	38	31	+7	44	
5	Moyola Park	26	12	5	9	40	34	+6	41	
6	Banbridge Town	26	9	9	8	35	34	+1	36	
7	Queen's University	26	10	6	10	35	37	−2	36	
8	Dundela	26	11	3	12	38	47	−9	36	
9	Newington YC	26	9	7	10	38	38	0	34	
10	Dollingstown (R)	26	9	7	10	46	51	−5	34	Relegation to the tier 4 regional leagues
11	Glebe Rangers (R)	26	9	5	12	34	46	−12	32	Relegation to the tier 4 regional leagues
12	Coagh United (R)	26	6	4	16	28	54	−26	22	Relegation to the tier 4 regional leagues
13	Portstewart (R)	26	6	3	17	34	58	−24	21	Relegation to the tier 4 regional leagues
14	Wakehurst (R)	26	1	4	21	25	67	−42	7	Relegation to the tier 4 regional leagues

Updated to match(es) played on 30 April 2016. Source: Northern Ireland Football League, Soccerway
Rules for classification: 1) Points; 2) Goal difference; 3) Goals scored; 4) Head-to-head points; 5) Head-to-head goal difference; 6) Drawing of lots.
(C) Champions; (P) Promoted; (R) Relegated

== Play-offs ==
=== UEFA Europa League play-offs ===
A new method of Europa League qualification was introduced for this season. In the vast majority of seasons, the Irish Cup winners finish seventh or higher in the Premiership. In this scenario, the four remaining Premiership teams from the top seven that have not already qualified for Europe (the teams in positions 3–7 excluding either the Irish Cup winners or the third-placed team awarded the berth) will compete in a series of play-offs for the final place in the Europa League. The play-offs are seeded, with the two higher-placed qualifiers given home advantage when facing the two lower-placed qualifiers in the semi-finals. The two semi-final winners then meet in the final.

If however, the Irish Cup winners finish lower than seventh in the league, all five Premiership teams that finish in third to seventh will qualify for the play-offs. This will require an additional quarter-final match to be played by the two lowest-placed qualifiers in sixth and seventh, with the winner joining the other three clubs in the semi-finals.

==== Semi-finals ====
Semi-final 1

3rd/4th-placed team	v	6th/7th-placed team

Semi-final 2

4th/5th-placed team	v	5th/6th-placed team

==== Final ====
Final

Winner of semi-final 1	v	Winner of semi-final 2

=== NIFL Premiership play-off ===
The club that finishes in 11th place in the Premiership will play the play-off qualifier from the 2015–16 NIFL Championship 1 over two legs for a place in next season's Premiership. The Premiership club will play the first leg away from home, with home advantage for the second leg.

First Leg

Championship 1 play-off qualifier	v	11th-placed Premiership team

Second Leg

11th-placed Premiership team	v	Championship 1 play-off qualifier

=== NIFL Championship play-off ===
The club that finishes in 11th place in Championship 1 will play the Championship 2 runners-up over two legs for a place in the 2016–17 NIFL Championship – the inaugural season in which the Championship will hold senior status. The play-off losers will enter the 2016–17 NIFL Premier Intermediate League, which will replace Championship 2 and will remain intermediate. The 11th-placed Championship 1 club will play the first leg away from home, with home advantage for the second leg.

First Leg

Championship 2 runners-up	v	11th-placed Championship 1 team

Second Leg

11th-placed Championship 1 team	v	Championship 2 runners-up
