= 2015–16 NIFL Premiership =

NIFL Premiership
- Season: 2015–16
- Dates: 8 August 2015 – 23 April 2016
- Champions: Crusaders; 2nd Premiership title 6th Irish title
- Relegated: Warrenpoint Town
- Champions League: Crusaders
- Europa League: Glenavon (via Irish Cup); Linfield; Cliftonville (via play-offs)
- Matches: 228
- Goals: 671 (2.94 per match)
- Top goalscorer: Paul Heatley; Andrew Waterworth (22 goals each)
- Biggest home win: Linfield 6–0 Dungannon Swifts (2 February 2016)
- Biggest away win: Ballymena United 1–7 Glenavon (12 August 2015)
- Highest scoring: Ballymena United 1–7 Glenavon (12 August 2015); Portadown 5–3 Glentoran (14 December 2015); Warrenpoint Town 2–6 Linfield (29 March 2016)
- Highest attendance: 6,000; Glentoran 1–2 Linfield (26 December 2015)
- Lowest attendance: 61; Warrenpoint Town 0–2 Dungannon Swifts (12 September 2015)
- Total attendance: 209,590
- Average attendance: 984
- All statistics correct as of 23 April 2016.

The 2015–16 NIFL Premiership (known as the Danske Bank Premiership for sponsorship reasons) was the 8th season of the NIFL Premiership, the highest level of league football in Northern Ireland, the 115th season of Irish league football overall, and the 3rd season of the league operating as part of the Northern Ireland Football League.

Crusaders were champions, winning the league for the 6th time and the 2nd consecutive season.

== Summary ==
The season began on 8 August 2015, and concluded with the final round of fixtures on 23 April 2016. The play-offs took place in May 2016.

Crusaders were the defending champions, after securing last season's title for the fifth time in the club's history on 18 April 2015 – their first title since the 1996–97 season. They successfully defended their title, winning the top flight title for the sixth time.

== Changes from 2014–15 ==
- As a result of the association climbing to 44th-place in the 2015 UEFA country coefficients (which takes into account their performance in European competitions from 2010–11 to 2014–15) this season's Premiership champions will enter the 2016–17 UEFA Champions League second qualifying round directly instead of the first qualifying round as in previous seasons.
- Finishing in third place no longer results in automatic entry into the UEFA Europa League qualifying rounds. At the end of the regular 38-game season, the clubs finishing from third to seventh position will participate in a series of play-offs. The winner of these play-offs will qualify for the 2016–17 UEFA Europa League first qualifying round, along with the league runners-up and the 2015–16 Irish Cup winners.

== Teams ==
After finishing bottom of the table on their return to the top flight in the 2014–15 season following a four–year absence, Institute suffered relegation back to Championship 1 after only one season. Carrick Rangers replaced them for this season's Premiership, after winning the 2014–15 Championship 1 title to secure a return to the top flight for the first time in the three years since they were relegated in the 2011–12 season.

Warrenpoint Town finished in 11th place – the Promotion/relegation play-off place – and faced Championship 1 runners-up Bangor over two legs for the last remaining place in this season's Premiership. Following a 2–2 draw on aggregate after extra time in the second leg, Warrenpoint Town eventually won 3–1 on penalties to avoid relegation and retain their Premiership status for this season.

=== Stadia and locations ===
Location of teams in the 2015–16 NIFL Premiership
Location of the Belfast-based teams in the 2015–16 NIFL Premiership

Club	Stadium	Location	Capacity^{‡}
Ballinamallard United	Ferney Park	Ballinamallard	2,000 (250 seated)
Ballymena United	The Showgrounds	Ballymena	3,050 (2,200 seated)
Carrick Rangers	Taylors Avenue	Carrickfergus	4,500 (800 seated)
Carrick Rangers	Seaview^{†}	Belfast	3,383 (all seated)
Cliftonville	Solitude	Belfast	2,530 (all seated)
Coleraine	The Showgrounds	Coleraine	2,496 (1,106 seated)
Crusaders	Seaview	Belfast	3,383 (all seated)
Dungannon Swifts	Stangmore Park	Dungannon	5,000 (300 seated)
Glenavon	Mourneview Park	Lurgan	4,160 (4,000 seated)
Glentoran	The Oval	Belfast	6,054 (4,989 seated)
Linfield	Windsor Park	Belfast	18,614 (all seated)
Portadown	Shamrock Park	Portadown	3,940 (2,765 seated)
Warrenpoint Town	Milltown	Warrenpoint	2,000 (250 seated)

*^‡Capacity numbers are approximate estimates, as no official figures have been released since 2010.
*^†Carrick Rangers played some 'home' games at Seaview as a result of ongoing issues with their own playing surface at Taylors Avenue.

=== Personnel and kits ===
Club	Manager	Kit manufacturer	Sponsors
Ballinamallard United	(Northern Ireland) Whitey Anderson	Nike	Severfield
Ballymena United	(Northern Ireland) David Jeffrey	Uhlsport	McBurney Transport
Carrick Rangers	(Northern Ireland) Gary Haveron	Nike	Hankook
Cliftonville	(Northern Ireland) Gerard Lyttle	Puma	Sean Graham
Coleraine	(Northern Ireland) Oran Kearney	Joma	TBF Thompson
Crusaders	(Northern Ireland) Stephen Baxter	Kappa	Toals
Dungannon Swifts	(Northern Ireland) Rodney McAree	Legea	Donnelly Vauxhall
Glenavon	(Northern Ireland) Gary Hamilton	Nike	Bedeck
Glentoran	(Republic of Ireland) Alan Kernaghan	Kappa	Bet McLean
Linfield	(Northern Ireland) David Healy	Nike	Geoghegan Conservatory
Portadown	(Northern Ireland) Pat McGibbon	Uhlsport	MET Steel
Warrenpoint Town	(Northern Ireland) Barry Gray	Umbro	Deli Lites

=== Managerial changes ===
Team	Outgoing manager	Manner of departure	Date of vacancy	Position in table	Incoming manager	Date of appointment
Cliftonville	(Northern Ireland) Tommy Breslin	Resigned	15 September 2015	3rd	(Northern Ireland) Gerard Lyttle	15 October 2015
Linfield	(Northern Ireland) Warren Feeney	Resigned	6 October 2015	1st	(Northern Ireland) David Healy	14 October 2015
Glentoran	(Northern Ireland) Eddie Patterson	Sacked	17 October 2015	7th	(Republic of Ireland) Alan Kernaghan	9 November 2015
Dungannon Swifts	(Northern Ireland) Darren Murphy	Resigned	24 October 2015	11th	(Northern Ireland) Rodney McAree	27 October 2015
Ballymena United	(Northern Ireland) Glenn Ferguson	Sacked	29 February 2016	9th	(Northern Ireland) David Jeffrey	7 March 2016
Portadown	(Northern Ireland) Ronnie McFall	Resigned/retired	5 March 2016	7th	(Northern Ireland) Pat McGibbon	9 March 2016

== League table ==
Pos	Team	Pld	W	D	L	GF	GA	GD	Pts	Qualification or relegation (Note: Teams played each other three times (33 matches), before the league was split into two groups (the top six and the bottom six) for the last five matches.)
1	Crusaders (C)	38	28	7	3	79	28	+51	91	Qualification for the Champions League second qualifying round
2	Linfield	38	26	5	7	91	35	+56	83	Qualification for the Europa League first qualifying round (Note: Glenavon qualified for the Europa League first qualifying round by winning the 2015–16 Irish Cup.)
3	Glenavon	38	20	9	9	72	40	+32	69	Qualification for the Europa League first qualifying round
4	Cliftonville (O)	38	18	10	10	58	53	+5	64	Qualification for the Europa League play-offs (Note: Cliftonville qualified for the Europa League first qualifying round by winning the Europa League play-offs.)
5	Coleraine	38	18	4	16	47	46	+1	58	Qualification for the Europa League play-offs
6	Glentoran	38	15	7	16	46	55	−9	52	Qualification for the Europa League play-offs
7	Dungannon Swifts (Note: Dungannon Swifts were ineligible for the Europa League play-offs, as they did not apply for a UEFA licence.)	38	12	7	19	51	66	−15	43	
8	Ballymena United	38	11	7	20	57	81	−24	40	
9	Portadown	38	11	5	22	43	67	−24	38	
10	Carrick Rangers	38	8	11	19	43	68	−25	35	
11	Ballinamallard United (O)	38	9	7	22	39	59	−20	34	Qualification for the relegation play-off
12	Warrenpoint Town (R)	38	9	7	22	45	73	−28	34	Relegation to the NIFL Championship

Source: RSSSF
Rules for classification: 1) Points; 2) Goal difference; 3) Goals scored; 4) Head-to-head points; 5) Head-to-head goal difference; 6) Drawing of lots.
(C) Champions; (O) Play-off winners; (R) Relegated

== Results ==
=== Matches 1–22 ===
During matches 1–22 each team will play every other team twice (home and away).

Home \ Away	BMD	BYM	CRK	CLI	COL	CRU	DUN	GLA	GLT	LIN	POR	WPT
Ballinamallard United		0–1	1–3	0–2	1–2	1–1	0–0	0–1	2–4	0–1	1–2	3–0
Ballymena United	1–1		1–1	6–1	0–2	2–4	1–0	1–7	0–1	1–3	1–1	4–2
Carrick Rangers	1–1	2–2		1–2	1–2	0–4	2–2	2–2	1–1	0–3	0–1	1–2
Cliftonville	3–1	4–2	1–0		4–0	0–1	1–0	1–1	1–0	3–3	3–0	2–1
Coleraine	2–1	2–1	2–1	0–0		1–1	1–0	0–2	1–0	1–3	4–0	2–0
Crusaders	5–0	3–2	5–0	2–2	3–1		4–0	1–0	3–0	3–0	1–2	1–0
Dungannon Swifts	2–0	2–0	1–2	0–1	0–3	1–2		1–2	2–4	0–1	3–1	5–1
Glenavon	5–1	3–1	2–0	0–1	3–0	1–2	3–1		0–0	3–2	1–0	1–1
Glentoran	0–2	1–3	2–0	2–0	1–1	2–2	1–1	2–0		1–2	1–0	2–1
Linfield	1–1	4–0	1–1	1–2	1–0	0–1	5–1	4–3	1–1		3–0	5–1
Portadown	0–3	3–2	3–2	0–1	1–2	1–3	3–3	2–2	5–3	2–0		2–1
Warrenpoint Town	0–3 (Note: Original 0–1 result recorded as 0–3, after Warrenpoint Town fielded a suspended player in the match.)	1–2	1–1	2–2	0–4	1–3	0–2	0–3	0–1	0–3	2–0	

Source: RSSSF
Legend: Blue = home team win; Yellow = draw; Red = away team win.

=== Matches 23–33 ===
During matches 23–33 each team will play every other team for the third time (either at home, or away).

Home \ Away	BMD	BYM	CRK	CLI	COL	CRU	DUN	GLA	GLT	LIN	POR	WPT
Ballinamallard United		4–2	1–2			0–1	1–1		1–0		1–0	
Ballymena United			1–0	2–2	0–2		2–4			0–4		3–1
Carrick Rangers					2–1	4–3	1–0	1–5	1–2			0–1
Cliftonville	2–0		3–3		1–3					0–2	1–0	1–1
Coleraine	1–0					0–2	0–1	0–1		2–3		
Crusaders		0–0		1–0			2–0	1–1	4–2			
Dungannon Swifts				2–2				0–1	3–1		2–1	1–0
Glenavon	1–0	1–1		3–3					1–3		4–1	
Glentoran		2–0		0–2	1–0						2–1	0–4
Linfield	2–1		2–0			2–0	6–0	1–1	3–0			
Portadown		3–4	0–0		0–1	0–1				2–1		1–3
Warrenpoint Town	3–0				3–0	1–1		1–3		2–6		

Source: RSSSF
Legend: Blue = home team win; Yellow = draw; Red = away team win.

=== Matches 34–38 ===
During matches 34–38 each team will play every other team in their half of the table once. As this will be the fourth time that teams play each other this season, home sides will be chosen so that they will have played each other twice at home and twice away.

==== Section A ====
Home \ Away	CLI	COL	CRU	GLA	GLT	LIN
Cliftonville			1–3	3–1	0–2	
Coleraine	3–0				1–1	
Crusaders		1–0				2–0
Glenavon		3–0	0–1			0–1
Glentoran			0–1	0–1		0–4
Linfield	4–0	3–0				

Source: RSSSF
Legend: Blue = home team win; Yellow = draw; Red = away team win.

==== Section B ====
Home \ Away	BMD	BYM	CRK	DUN	POR	WPT
Ballinamallard United						2–0
Ballymena United	1–2				0–2	
Carrick Rangers	2–1	0–2			1–2	
Dungannon Swifts	4–2	2–4	1–3			
Portadown	0–0			1–2		
Warrenpoint Town		4–1	1–1	1–1	2–0	

Source: RSSSF
Legend: Blue = home team win; Yellow = draw; Red = away team win.

== Play-offs ==
=== UEFA Europa League play-offs ===
A new method of Europa League qualification was introduced for this season. As a result of the Irish Cup winners (Glenavon) finishing third in the league, the four remaining teams from the top seven that have not already qualified for Europe (the teams in positions 4–7) competed in a series of play-offs for the final place in the Europa League. The play-offs were seeded, with the higher-placed qualifiers given home advantage when facing the lower-placed qualifiers in the semi-finals. The two semi-final winners then met in the final. If three teams qualify for the play-offs, the highest-placed qualifier will receive a bye into the final with home advantage.

Had the Irish Cup winners finished lower than seventh in the league, all five teams that finished in third to seventh would have qualified for the play-offs. This would have required an additional quarter-final match to be played by the two lowest-placed qualifiers in sixth and seventh, with the winner joining the other three clubs in the semi-finals.

Dungannon Swifts finished in seventh place, but they were ineligible for the Europa League play-offs, as they did not apply for a UEFA licence. Therefore, only one semi-final match was played and fourth-placed Cliftonville were given a bye to the final.

==== Semi-final ====
6 May 2016
19:45 BST

Coleraine (5th)	1–2	Glentoran (6th)
McGonigle 85'	Soccerway; BBC Sport	Birney 33'; Allen 58'

The Showgrounds, Coleraine
Referee: Andrew Davey

==== Final ====
10 May 2016
19:45 BST

Cliftonville (4th)	3–2	Glentoran (6th)
Donnelly 11'; Knowles 62' (pen.); McDaid 80'	Soccerway; BBC Sport	Allen 17'; Magee 28'

Solitude, Belfast
Referee: Raymond Crangle

=== NIFL Premiership play-off ===
Eleventh-placed Ballinamallard United will play Institute, the play-off qualifier from the 2015–16 NIFL Championship 1 over two legs for a place in the 2016–17 NIFL Premiership. The Premiership club will play the first leg away from home, with home advantage for the second leg.

The matches were originally set to be played on 6 May and 10 May 2016.

6 May 2016
19:45 BST

Institute	1–2	Ballinamallard United
McCrudden 26' (pen.)	Soccerway; BBC Sport	O'Flynn 22'; Currie 69'

Riverside Stadium, Drumahoe
Referee: Keith Kennedy

On 9 May 2016, the IFA postponed the second leg until the conclusion of an investigation into allegations that Gary Haveron, the manager of Carrick Rangers may have failed to correctly serve a touchline ban. It is alleged that he was in the dugout at their 23 April match against Dungannon Swifts, which they won 3–1, instead sitting out another game when he was not actually banned. The possible ramifications of these allegations were that if it was found that Haveron did not properly serve the ban, the penalty would have been a minimum fine of £350 and Carrick Rangers would forfeit the game as a 0–3 loss. This three-point deduction would have moved Carrick to the bottom of the table and automatic relegation, Ballinamallard would have risen to 10th and safety and Warrenpoint town would have risen to 11th and would then face Institute in the Play-off. Carrick Rangers were formally charged with a formal breach of Article 23.1 of the IFA Disciplinary code and on 14 May Carrick Rangers announced that they will contest the charge and will make a further statement following receipt of legal advice. On 18 May, however, no sanctions were imposed on the club after a disciplinary hearing and the second leg of the Play-off was rescheduled for 22 June.

22 June 2016
19:45 BST

Ballinamallard United	3–3	Institute
Friars 22'; Beacom 59'; Feeney 90+4'	Soccerway	Dunne 17'; Brown 28'; McGinty 62'

Ferney Park, Ballinamallard
Referee: Raymond Hetherington

Ballinamallard United won 5–4 on aggregate.

== Season statistics ==
=== Top goalscorers ===
As of 23 April 2016

Rank	Scorer	Club	Goals
1	(Northern Ireland) Paul Heatley	Crusaders	22
1	(Northern Ireland) Andrew Waterworth	Linfield	22
3	(Northern Ireland) Aaron Burns	Linfield	19
4	(Northern Ireland) Curtis Allen	Glentoran	18
4	(Northern Ireland) Jordan Owens	Crusaders	18
6	(Northern Ireland) Eoin Bradley	Glenavon	17
7	(Northern Ireland) Stephen Murray	Warrenpoint Town	15
8	(Northern Ireland) Andrew Mitchell	Dungannon Swifts	14
9	(Portugal) Miguel Chines	Carrick Rangers	12
9	(Northern Ireland) David McDaid	Cliftonville	12
9	(Northern Ireland) James McLaughlin	Coleraine	12

== Attendances ==
#	Club	Average
1	Linfield	2,304
2	Crusaders	1,532
3	Glentoran	1,448
4	Cliftonville	1,206
5	Glenavon	1,054
6	Ballymena	958
7	Coleraine	896
8	Portadown	665
9	Carrick	514
10	Dungannon	427
11	Ballinamallard	388
12	Warrenpoint	236
