= BMFC =

BMFC may refer to:

- Bacchus Marsh Football Club
- Beann Mhádagháin F.C.
- Bengal Mumbai FC
- Black Mambas F.C.
- Blackers Mill F.C.
- Bourneview Mill F.C.
- Broomhedge Maghaberry F.C.
