= 1999–2000 Irish League =

Irish League Premier Division
- Season: 1999–2000
- Champions: Linfield; 43rd Irish title
- Relegated: Lisburn Distillery
- Matches played: 180
- Goals scored: 516 (2.87 per match)
- Top goalscorer: Vinny Arkins (29 goals)

The 1999–2000 Irish League was the 99th edition of the Irish League, the highest level of league competition in Northern Irish football. The league consisted of 10 teams, and Linfield won the championship.

== Premier Division ==
Location of teams in the 1999–2000 Irish League Premier Division
Location of the Belfast-based teams in the 1999–2000 Irish League Premier Division

=== League standings ===
Pos	Team	Pld	W	D	L	GF	GA	GD	Pts	Qualification or Relegation
1	Linfield (C)	36	24	7	5	67	30	+37	79	Qualification for the Champions League first qualifying round
2	Coleraine	36	18	7	11	64	42	+22	61	Qualification for the UEFA Cup qualifying round
3	Glenavon	36	17	10	9	55	34	+21	61	Qualification for the Intertoto Cup first round
4	Glentoran	36	18	7	11	59	51	+8	61	Qualification for the UEFA Cup qualifying round
5	Portadown	36	15	7	14	64	62	+2	52	
6	Newry Town	36	11	7	18	44	58	−14	40	
7	Crusaders	36	9	13	14	41	55	−14	40	
8	Ballymena United	36	6	16	14	45	62	−17	34	
9	Cliftonville	36	7	13	16	38	59	−21	34	Qualification for the promotion/relegation play-off
10	Lisburn Distillery (R)	36	9	5	22	39	63	−24	32	Relegation to the First Division

Source: rsssf.com
(C) Champions; (R) Relegated

=== Results ===
==== Matches 1–18 ====
Home \ Away	BLM	CLI	COL	CRU	GLV	GLT	LIN	DIS	NEW	POR
Ballymena United		2–1	0–0	1–1	0–3	0–0	0–1	1–1	0–0	1–1
Cliftonville	1–1		0–0	1–1	1–1	1–2	0–1	0–0	0–2	1–2
Coleraine	1–0	0–1		1–2	1–1	1–2	0–1	3–0	2–0	4–0
Crusaders	2–2	1–1	0–2		0–4	1–0	0–4	1–2	1–0	0–1
Glenavon	0–0	0–1	0–0	1–0		3–3	0–0	1–2	2–1	1–1
Glentoran	3–1	1–1	2–0	1–2	1–2		1–0	2–0	0–3	1–0
Linfield	3–0	1–2	3–0	0–0	1–0	1–2		1–0	3–1	2–1
Lisburn Distillery	2–1	0–1	1–2	0–1	1–1	1–0	1–2		0–1	2–1
Newry Town	2–2	3–1	0–1	1–1	0–1	1–0	0–3	1–1		0–1
Portadown	0–2	2–2	3–2	2–1	1–3	1–0	0–2	3–2	0–0	

Source: Irish League Archive
Legend: Blue = home team win; Yellow = draw; Red = away team win.

==== Matches 19–36 ====
Home \ Away	BLM	CLI	COL	CRU	GLV	GLT	LIN	DIS	NEW	POR
Ballymena United		2–2	2–2	2–2	2–0	2–1	1–3	2–1	2–2	2–4
Cliftonville	3–2		1–4	1–1	1–2	2–2	2–3	0–2	3–2	2–0
Coleraine	1–1	1–1		4–2	2–0	1–2	2–1	3–0	4–1	4–1
Crusaders	3–0	1–1	1–3		3–1	2–2	1–1	2–0	1–0	2–4
Glenavon	2–0	4–0	0–1	2–1		3–3	3–0	2–0	3–0	3–1
Glentoran	3–2	3–0	3–2	2–0	2–1		1–1	3–1	2–1	5–3
Linfield	3–2	3–1	3–1	0–0	1–1	2–0		3–2	3–2	3–1
Lisburn Distillery	3–4	1–0	1–3	2–2	1–2	2–0	1–4		2–3	2–1
Newry Town	3–1	3–2	3–0	2–0	0–2	3–4	0–3	2–1		1–1
Portadown	2–2	3–0	3–6	4–2	2–0	4–0	1–1	4–1	5–0	

Source: Irish League Archive
Legend: Blue = home team win; Yellow = draw; Red = away team win.

== First Division ==
Irish League First Division
- Champions: Omagh Town
- Promoted: Omagh Town
- Matches played: 180
- Goals scored: 536 (2.98 per match)

Location of teams in the 1999–2000 Irish League First Division

=== League standings ===
Pos	Team	Pld	W	D	L	GF	GA	GD	Pts	Qualification or Promotion
1	Omagh Town (C, P)	36	20	10	6	65	35	+30	70	Promotion to the Premier Division
2	Ards	36	16	16	4	65	36	+29	64	Qualification for the promotion/relegation play-off
3	Limavady United	36	17	9	10	54	42	+12	60	
4	Bangor	36	16	9	11	60	49	+11	57	
5	Larne	36	15	9	12	56	53	+3	54	
6	Institute	36	14	9	13	59	53	+6	51	
7	Armagh City	36	10	10	16	50	61	−11	40	
8	Dungannon Swifts	36	9	8	19	43	62	−19	35	
9	Carrick Rangers	36	8	10	18	45	64	−19	34	
10	Ballyclare Comrades	36	8	4	24	39	81	−42	28	

Source: rsssf.com
(C) Champions; (P) Promoted

== Promotion/relegation play-off ==
Cliftonville, who finished in the relegation play-off place, faced Ards, the 2nd-placed team in the First Division, in a two-legged tie for a place in next season's Irish League Premier Division.

2 May 2000

Ards	0 – 2	Cliftonville

Castlereagh Park, Newtownards

4 May 2000

Cliftonville	1 – 0	Ards

Solitude, Belfast

Cliftonville won 3–0 on aggregate
