= 1997–98 Irish League =

Irish League Premier Division
- Season: 1997–98
- Champions: Cliftonville; 3rd Irish title
- Relegated: Ards
- Matches played: 180
- Goals scored: 469 (2.61 per match)
- Top goalscorer: Vinny Arkins (22 goals)

The 1997–98 Irish League was the 97th edition of the Irish League, the highest level of league competition in Northern Irish football. The league consisted of 10 teams, and Cliftonville won the championship.

== Premier Division ==
Location of teams in the 1997–98 Irish League Premier Division
Location of the Belfast-based teams in the 1997–98 Irish League Premier Division

=== League standings ===
Pos	Team	Pld	W	D	L	GF	GA	GD	Pts	Qualification or Relegation
1	Cliftonville (C)	36	20	8	8	49	37	+12	68	Qualification for the Champions League first qualifying round
2	Linfield	36	17	13	6	50	19	+31	64	Qualification for the UEFA Cup first qualifying round
3	Portadown	36	17	9	10	50	38	+12	60	
4	Glentoran	36	17	8	11	52	34	+18	59	Qualification for the Cup Winners' Cup qualifying round
5	Ballymena United	36	14	9	13	55	55	0	51	
6	Crusaders	36	13	12	11	51	51	0	51	
7	Coleraine	36	11	10	15	41	48	−7	43	
8	Glenavon	36	9	12	15	47	56	−9	39	
9	Omagh Town	36	7	10	19	43	68	−25	31	Promotion/relegation play-off and Intertoto Cup first round
10	Ards (R)	36	4	11	21	31	63	−32	23	Relegation to the First Division

Source: Irish League Archive
(C) Champions; (R) Relegated

=== Results ===
==== Matches 1–18 ====
Home \ Away	ARD	BLM	CLI	COL	CRU	GLV	GLT	LIN	OMA	POR
Ards		0–2	1–1	0–0	0–1	1–1	0–2	0–1	1–2	0–1
Ballymena United	1–1		2–0	1–0	1–0	0–0	0–2	0–2	2–1	1–2
Cliftonville	1–0	0–2		1–0	0–1	1–0	0–2	0–3	1–0	1–0
Coleraine	2–1	0–0	0–2		0–0	1–2	1–5	0–0	1–1	0–1
Crusaders	1–0	3–4	0–2	1–3		3–2	0–2	1–0	1–0	1–3
Glenavon	0–0	1–2	0–0	1–1	2–0		1–0	2–3	2–2	1–5
Glentoran	2–0	1–2	0–2	1–0	1–1	0–1		0–3	1–0	1–1
Linfield	2–0	0–0	0–1	1–0	0–0	1–1	2–0		0–0	0–0
Omagh Town	2–1	3–0	0–1	1–3	1–1	2–1	0–5	0–3		0–2
Portadown	1–0	1–1	0–2	0–1	1–1	2–0	2–0	0–0	1–1	

Source: Irish League Archive
Legend: Blue = home team win; Yellow = draw; Red = away team win.

==== Matches 19–36 ====
Home \ Away	ARD	BLM	CLI	COL	CRU	GLV	GLT	LIN	OMA	POR
Ards		2–1	2–3	1–0	1–1	3–4	1–1	1–5	2–2	1–1
Ballymena United	3–1		4–0	2–2	2–3	2–1	1–2	1–1	4–2	1–2
Cliftonville	2–2	5–2		3–1	2–2	1–1	1–1	2–1	4–0	3–1
Coleraine	2–2	0–1	5–1		4–0	0–1	2–1	1–0	4–3	2–0
Crusaders	4–0	4–2	2–2	3–0		4–1	0–3	1–2	2–2	2–1
Glenavon	1–2	3–3	0–0	4–0	2–2		1–0	2–4	2–4	3–0
Glentoran	3–0	2–2	1–0	3–0	1–1	1–0		1–1	2–0	2–1
Linfield	4–0	1–0	0–1	1–1	0–0	2–0	3–0		1–1	1–1
Omagh Town	2–4	3–2	0–1	1–3	1–2	2–2	1–1	1–0		1–2
Portadown	1–0	4–0	1–2	1–1	3–2	2–1	3–2	0–2	3–1	

Source: Irish League Archive
Legend: Blue = home team win; Yellow = draw; Red = away team win.

== First Division ==
Irish League First Division
- Champions: Newry Town
- Promoted: Newry Town
- Matches played: 112
- Goals scored: 350 (3.13 per match)

Location of teams in the 1997–98 Irish League First Division

=== League standings ===
Pos	Team	Pld	W	D	L	GF	GA	GD	Pts	Qualification or Promotion
1	Newry Town (C, P)	28	20	5	3	61	18	+43	65	Promotion to the Premier Division
2	Bangor	28	18	4	6	51	26	+25	58	Qualification for the promotion/relegation play-off
3	Distillery	28	15	6	7	48	34	+14	51	
4	Dungannon Swifts	28	14	6	8	63	49	+14	48	
5	Ballyclare Comrades	28	13	3	12	47	45	+2	42	
6	Larne	28	8	2	18	30	58	−28	26	
7	Limavady United	28	5	3	20	29	61	−32	18	
8	Carrick Rangers	28	3	3	22	21	59	−38	12	

Source: rsssf.com
(C) Champions; (P) Promoted

== Promotion/relegation play-off ==
Omagh Town, who finished in the relegation play-off place, faced Bangor, the 2nd-placed team in the First Division, in a two-legged tie for a place in next season's Irish League Premier Division.

27 April 1998

Bangor	0 – 5	Omagh Town

Clandeboye Park, Bangor

30 April 1998

Omagh Town	1 – 0	Bangor

St Julian's Road, Omagh

Omagh Town won 6–0 on aggregate
