= NTFC =

NTFC may refer to:

- Nantwich Town F.C.
- Newcastle Town F.C., England
- Newcastle Town F.C., Northern Ireland
- Northampton Town F.C.
