= 2012–13 Ipswich Town F.C. season =

Ipswich Town
2012–13 season
- Chairman: Marcus Evans
- Manager: Paul Jewell (left 24 October 2012); Chris Hutchings (caretaker) (24 October to 1 November 2012); Mick McCarthy (from 1 November 2012)
- Stadium: Portman Road
- Championship: 14th
- FA Cup: Third round
- League Cup: Second round
- Top goalscorer: League: DJ Campbell (10); All: DJ Campbell (10)
- Highest home attendance: 21,988 (vs Hull City, 13 April 2013, Championship)
- Lowest home attendance: 8,645 (vs Bristol Rovers, 14 August 2012, League Cup)
- Average home league attendance: 17,543
Home colours	Away colours	Third colours

The 2012–13 season is Ipswich Town's eleventh consecutive season in the Football League Championship, the second-highest division in the English football league system. In addition to competing in the Championship, Ipswich Town also competed in the League Cup and the FA Cup.

== First-team squad ==
Note: Flags indicate national team as defined under FIFA eligibility rules; some limited exceptions apply. Players may hold more than one non-FIFA nationality.

No.	Pos.	Nation	Player
1	GK	ENG	Scott Loach
2	DF	WAL	Elliott Hewitt
3	DF	ENG	Aaron Cresswell
4	DF	ENG	Luke Chambers
5	DF	ENG	Richard Stearman (on loan from Woverhampton Wanderers)
6	DF	AUS	Patrick Kisnorbo (on loan from Leeds United)
7	MF	TTO	Carlos Edwards (captain)
8	MF	SEN	Guirane N'Daw (on loan from Saint-Étienne)
9	FW	ENG	Jay Emmanuel-Thomas
10	FW	ENG	Michael Chopra
11	MF	ENG	Lee Martin
12	GK	ENG	Arran Lee-Barrett
13	GK	WAL	Jason Brown

No.	Pos.	Nation	Player
14	MF	ENG	Anthony Wordsworth
15	DF	ENG	Tyrone Mings
16	FW	ENG	David McGoldrick (on loan from Nottingham Forest)
17	MF	ENG	Andy Drury
18	MF	IRL	Jay Tabb (on loan from Reading)
19	MF	ENG	Luke Hyam
20	DF	NZL	Tommy Smith
21	DF	ENG	Reece Brown (on loan from Manchester United)
22	MF	NIR	Josh Carson
25	FW	ENG	Aaron McLean (on loan from Hull City)
26	FW	ENG	Paul Taylor
27	FW	IRL	Daryl Murphy (on loan from Celtic)
35	FW	ENG	Frank Nouble

=== Out on loan ===
Note: Flags indicate national team as defined under FIFA eligibility rules; some limited exceptions apply. Players may hold more than one non-FIFA nationality.

No.	Pos.	Nation	Player
5	DF	IRL	Damien Delaney (to Crystal Palace)
5	FW	ENG	DJ Campbell (loan return to Queens Park Rangers)
6	DF	ENG	Danny Higginbotham (loan return to Stoke City)
13	GK	IRL	Stephen Henderson (loan return to West Ham United)
14	FW	TTO	Jason Scotland (to Barnsley)
15	MF	AUS	Massimo Luongo (loan return to Tottenham Hotspur)
16	MF	ENG	Richie Wellens (loan return to Leicester City)

No.	Pos.	Nation	Player
16	MF	SCO	Ryan Stevenson (to Heart of Midlothian)
18	FW	ENG	Nathan Ellington (released)
21	DF	FRA	Bilel Mohsni (loan return to Southend United)
23	MF	ENG	Nigel Reo-Coker (to Vancouver Whitecaps)
24	DF	ENG	Bradley Orr (loan return to Blackburn Rovers)
25	FW	ENG	Tyrone Barnett (loan return to Peterborough United)
–	DF	CAF	Kelly Youga (released)

=== Under-23 squad ===
Note: Flags indicate national team as defined under FIFA eligibility rules; some limited exceptions apply. Players may hold more than one non-FIFA nationality.

No.	Pos.	Nation	Player
28	FW	IRL	Ronan Murray
29	DF	ENG	Jack Ainsley
31	MF	ENG	Byron Lawrence

No.	Pos.	Nation	Player
32	MF	NIR	Cormac Burke
34	FW	ENG	Jack Marriott

== First-team coaching staff ==
Until 24 October:

Position	Name
Manager	(England) Paul Jewell
Assistant Manager	(England) Chris Hutchings
Assistant Manager	(Wales) Sean McCarthy
Goalkeeping Coach	(England) Malcolm Webster
Fitness Coach	(Scotland) Andy Liddell
Head Physiotherapist	(England) Matt Byard
Assistant Head Physiotherapist	(England) Alex Chapman
Kitman	(England) Paul Beesley

From 1 November:

Position	Name
Manager	(Republic of Ireland) Mick McCarthy
Assistant Manager	(England) Terry Connor
Goalkeeping Coach	(England) Malcolm Webster
Fitness Coach	(Scotland) Andy Liddell
Head Physiotherapist	(England) Matt Byard
Assistant Head Physiotherapist	(England) Alex Chapman
Kitman	(England) Paul Beesley

== Pre-season ==
17 July 2012	Helmond Sport	1–1	Ipswich Town	Stadion De Braak
18:00 BST	Güvenç 13'		Chopra 55'

19 July 2012	Den Bosch	1–1	Ipswich Town	De Vliert
18:00 BST	Wolters 63'		Cresswell 83'

24 July 2012	Braintree Town	0–3	Ipswich Town XI	Cressing Road
19:30 BST			Ellington 75'

25 July 2012	Cambridge United	0–2	Ipswich Town	Abbey Stadium
19:45 BST			Chopra 63' 80'

28 July 2012	Luton Town	2–0	Ipswich Town	Kenilworth Road
15:00 BST	Kovács 37', 89'			Attendance: 2,440

31 July 2012	Southend United	2–1	Ipswich Town	Roots Hall
19:45 BST

1 August 2012	AFC Sudbury	1–6	Ipswich Town XI	King's Marsh
TBC

4 August 2012	Ipswich Town	3–1	West Ham United	Portman Road
15:00 BST	Chopra 15'; Chambers 19'; Scotland 83'	Report	Taylor 73'

8 August 2012	Colchester United	1–2	Ipswich Town	Colchester Community Stadium
19:45 BST			Chopra

== Competitions ==
=== Football League Championship ===
==== League table ====
Pos	Team	Pld	W	D	L	GF	GA	GD	Pts
12	Birmingham City	46	15	16	15	63	69	−6	61
13	Leeds United	46	17	10	19	57	66	−9	61
14	Ipswich Town	46	16	12	18	48	61	−13	60
15	Blackpool	46	14	17	15	62	63	−1	59
16	Middlesbrough	46	18	5	23	61	70	−9	59

Updated to match(es) played on 4 May 2013. Source: BBC Sport
Rules for classification: 1) points; 2) goal difference; 3) number of goals scored.

==== Results summary ====
Overall								Home						Away					
Pld	W	D	L	GF	GA	GD	Pts	W	D	L	GF	GA	GD	W	D	L	GF	GA	GD
46	16	12	18	48	61	−13	60	10	5	8	34	27	+7	6	7	10	14	34	−20

Last updated: 4 May 2013.
Source: Table

==== Results by round ====
Round	1	2	3	4	5	6	7	8	9	10	11	12	13	14	15	16	17	18	19	20	21	22	23	24	25	26	27	28	29	30	31	32	33	34	35	36	37	38	39	40	41	42	43	44	45	46
Ground	H	A	A	H	A	H	H	A	A	H	A	H	H	A	A	H	A	H	H	A	H	A	H	A	A	H	A	H	A	H	A	H	H	A	H	A	A	H	H	A	A	H	H	A	H	A
Result	D	W	L	D	L	L	L	D	D	L	L	L	L	W	L	W	L	D	W	W	W	L	D	W	W	L	D	D	L	W	L	W	L	D	W	L	D	W	W	D	W	L	W	D	W	L
Position	15	4	15	17	19	23	23	23	23	23	23	24	24	24	24	22	22	23	21	20	20	20	20	20	19	19	20	19	21	19	20	18	18	19	18	19	20	17	16	17	14	17	13	14	11	14

Updated to match(es) played on 4 May 2013. Source: Fixtures Table
A = Away; H = Home; W = Win; D = Draw; L = Loss

==== August ====
18 August 2012 1	Ipswich Town	1–1	Blackburn Rovers	Portman Road
15:00	Luongo (yellow card) 20'; Lowe 82' (o.g.)	Report	Kazim-Richards 21'; Murphy (yellow card) 36'; Etuhu (yellow card) 47'	Attendance: 19,117; Referee: Drysdale

21 August 2012 2	Watford	0–1	Ipswich Town	Vicarage Road
19:45	Yeates (yellow card) 90+2'	Report	Chopra 90'	Attendance: 12,422; Referee: East

25 August 2012 3	Blackpool	6–0	Ipswich Town	Bloomfield Road
15:00	Cresswell 13' (o.g.); Baptiste (yellow card) 21'; Taylor-Fletcher 45'; Ince 49', 58'; Cathcart 62'; Dicko 90'	Report	Chopra (yellow card) 32'	Referee: Miller

==== September ====
1 September 2012 4	Ipswich Town	2–2	Huddersfield Town	Portman Road
15:00	Drury (yellow card) 50'; Chambers 62'; Chopra 72'	Report	Clayton 36'; Vaughan 80' (yellow card) 85'	Attendance: 16,843; Referee: Russell

15 September 2012 5	Middlesbrough	2–0	Ipswich Town	Riverside
15:00	Williams 34'; Miller (yellow card) 41'; Carayol 90+3'	Report		Attendance: 14,887; Referee: Gibbs

18 September 2012 6	Ipswich Town	0–2	Wolverhampton Wanderers	Portman Road
19:45	Chopra (yellow card) 85'	Report	Smith 69' (o.g.); Doumbia 77'; Boukari (yellow card) 79'	Attendance: 16,540; Referee: Scott

22 September 2012 7	Ipswich Town	1–2	Charlton Athletic	Portman Road
15:00	Emmanuel Thomas (yellow card) 26'; Martin (yellow card) 52'; Scotland 57'	Report	Jackson 48'; Fuller 50'	Attendance: 16,587; Referee: Atkinson

29 September 2012 8	Barnsley	1–1	Ipswich Town	Oakwell
15:00	Dawson 73'	Report	Cresswell 6' (yellow card) 54'; N'Daw (yellow card) 47'; Martin (yellow card) 56'; Chambers (yellow card) 70'; Luongo (yellow card) 88'	Attendance: 8,571; Referee: Kettle

==== October ====
2 October 2012 9	Brighton & Hove Albion	1–1	Ipswich Town	Falmer Stadium
19:45	Hammond (yellow card) 49'; Bridcutt (yellow card) 76'; Buckley 80'; El-Abd (yellow card) 90'	Report	Murphy 27'	Referee: Graham

6 October 2012 10	Ipswich Town	1–2	Cardiff City	Portman Road
15:00	Drury (yellow card) 42'; Campbell 45+1'	Report	Helguson 63', 88'	Attendance: 16,434; Referee: Ilderton

20 October 2012 11	Hull City	2–1	Ipswich Town	KC Stadium
15:00	Proschwitz 74', 90+3'	Report	Emmanuel-Thomas 29'; Murphy (yellow card) 31'; Wellens (yellow card) 82'; Henderson (yellow card) 90+1'; Drury (yellow card) 90+5'	Attendance: 15,983; Referee: Coote

23 October 2012 12	Ipswich Town	1–2	Derby County	Portman Road
19:45	Campbell 24'; Martin (yellow card) 35'; Chopra (yellow card) 79'	Report	Robinson 40'; O'Connor (yellow card) 52'; Tyson 90+1'	Attendance: 15,417; Referee: Madley

27 October 2012 13	Ipswich Town	0–3	Sheffield Wednesday	Portman Road
15:00	Martin (yellow card) 68'; Chambers (yellow card) 90+3'	Report	Barkley 2', 58'; Gardner (yellow card) 24'; Bothroyd (yellow card) 65'; Antonio 81'	Attendance: 17,738; Referee: East

==== November ====
3 November 2012 14	Birmingham City	0–1	Ipswich Town	St Andrew's
15:00		Report	Campbell 8'; Mohsni (yellow card) 85'	Attendance: 18,063; Referee: Attwell

6 November 2012 15	Crystal Palace	5–0	Ipswich Town	Selhurst Park
20:00	Bolasie 24'; Dikgacoi (yellow card) 32'; Murray 50' (pen.), 55' (pen.), 63'; Zaha (yellow card) 81'; Moritz 90+4'	Report	Reo-Coker (yellow card) 49'	Attendance: 15,517; Referee: Sheldrake

10 November 2012 16	Ipswich Town	2–1	Burnley	Portman Road
15:00	Murphy 51'; Reo-Coker (yellow card) 81'; Campbell 87'	Report	Wallace (yellow card) 61'; Vokes 80'; Paterson (yellow card) 85'	Attendance: 16,297; Referee: Brown

17 November 2012 17	Leicester City	6–0	Ipswich Town	King Power Stadium
15:00	Nugent 8' (pen.), 18'; Dyer 27'; Knockaert 44'; Waghorn 53'; Futács 82'	Report	Reo-Coker (yellow card) 90'	Attendance: 20,779; Referee: Stroud

24 November 2012 18	Ipswich Town	1–1	Peterborough United	Portman Road
15:00	Campbell 60' (pen.); N'Daw (yellow card) 90'	Report	Tomlin 8'	Attendance: 16,728; Referee: Halsey

27 November 2012 19	Ipswich Town	3–1	Nottingham Forest	Portman Road
19:45	N'Daw 30'; Hyam 61' (yellow card) 69'; Orr (yellow card) 69'; Murphy 89'	Report	Camp (yellow card) 16'; Blackstock 58'; Sharp (yellow card) 69'	Attendance: 16,200; Referee: D'Urso

==== December ====
1 December 2012 20	Bolton Wanderers	1–2	Ipswich Town	Reebok Stadium
15:00	Davies 6'; Mears (yellow card) 70'	Report	Campbell (yellow card) 18' (goal) 70' (pen.); Chopra (yellow card) 78' (goal) 90'	Attendance: 17,208; Referee: Naylor

8 December 2012 21	Ipswich Town	3–0	Millwall	Portman Road
15:00	Campbell 37', 64' (pen.); Murphy 49'	Report	Wood (yellow card) 34'; Beevers (yellow card) 81'	Attendance: 17,380; Referee: Coote

15 December 2012 22	Leeds United	2–0	Ipswich Town	Elland Road
15:00	Thomas 19'; Green 68'; Norris (yellow card) 79'	Report		Attendance: 19,185; Referee: Langford

22 December 2012 23	Ipswich Town	1–1	Bristol City	Portman Road
15:00	Smith 32'	Report	Danns 11'	Attendance: 17,290; Referee: Haywood

26 December 2012 24	Charlton Athletic	1–2	Ipswich Town	The Valley
13:00	Morrison (yellow card) 38'; Haynes 72' (pen.)	Report	Campbell 34'; Murphy 45'	Attendance: 18,380; Referee: Russell

29 December 2012 25	Wolverhampton Wanderers	0–2	Ipswich Town	Molineux
15:00	Ebanks-Blake (yellow card) 42'	Report	Creswell 33'; Campbell (yellow card) 49' (goal) 64'; Martin (yellow card) 77'	Attendance: 28,595; Referee: Drysdale

==== January ====
1 January 2013 26	Ipswich Town	0–3	Brighton & Hove Albion	Portman Road
15:00	Martin (yellow card) 1'	Report	Hammond 15'; Mackail-Smith 34'; Bridcutt (yellow card) 61'; El-Abd (yellow card) 62'; Bridge 67'	Attendance: 19,108; Referee: Friend

12 January 2013 27	Cardiff City	0–0	Ipswich Town	Cardiff City Stadium
15:00		Report	Hyam (yellow card) 78'; Orr (yellow card) 90+1'	Attendance: 22,724; Referee: Mathieson

19 January 2013 28	Ipswich Town	1–1	Barnsley	Portman Road
15:00	Chambers 56'	Report	Perkins (yellow card) 55'; Rose 89'	Attendance: 15,913; Referee: Miller

26 January 2013 29	Bristol City	2–1	Ipswich Town	Ashton Gate
15:00	Davies 47'	Report	Murphy 30'; Stead 90'	Attendance: 12,662; Referee: Martin

==== February ====
2 February 2013 30	Ipswich Town	4–0	Middlesbrough	Portman Road
15:00	Smith 38', 78'; McGoldrick 47'; McLean 56'; N'Daw (yellow card) 80'	Report		Attendance: 16,389; Referee: Pawson

9 February 2013 31	Blackburn Rovers	1–0	Ipswich Town	Ewood Park
15:00	Henderson 61' (o.g.); Kazim-Richards (yellow card) 79'	Report		Attendance: 14,342; Referee: Wright

16 February 2013 32	Ipswich Town	1–0	Blackpool	Portman Road
15:00	Chopra 50'; N'Daw (yellow card) 78'	Report		Attendance: 16,673; Referee: Madley

19 February 2013 33	Ipswich Town	0–2	Watford	Portman Road
19:45	Stearman (yellow card) 68'; Smith (yellow card) 45+1'	Report	Anya 18'; Deeney (yellow card) 58'; Forestieri (yellow card) 65'; Abdi (yellow card) 69'; Chalobah 72'; Ekstrand (yellow card) 90'	Attendance: 16,821; Referee: East

23 February 2013 34	Huddersfield Town	0–0	Ipswich Town	John Smith's Stadium
15:00	Vaughan (yellow card) 62'	Report		Attendance: 13,083; Referee: Dean

==== March ====
2 March 2013 35	Ipswich Town	1–0	Leicester CIty	Portman Road
15:00	Hyam (yellow card) 74'; McGoldrick 85'	Report	Knockaert (yellow card) 46'; Morgan (yellow card) 82'	Attendance: 17,021; Referee: Deadman

5 March 2013 36	Nottingham Forest	1–0	Ipswich Town	Portman Road
19:45	Ward (yellow card) 6'; Lansbury (yellow card) 41'; McGugan 84'; Hutchinson (yellow card) 87'; Reid (yellow card) 89'	Report	Stearman (yellow card) 16' (yellow-red card); Martin (red card) 40'	Attendance: 19,458; Referee: Webb

9 March 2013 37	Peterborough United	0–0	Ipswich Town	London Road Stadium
15:00	Swanson (yellow card) 21'; Mendez-Laing (yellow card) 36'	Report		Attendance: 9,367; Referee: Linington

16 March 2013 38	Ipswich Town	1–0	Bolton Wanderers	Portman Road
15:00	Edwards 88'	Report	Pratley (yellow card) 30'; Davies (yellow card) 63'	Attendance: 17,021; Referee: Attwell

30 March 2013 39	Ipswich Town	3–0	Leeds United	Portman Road
15:00	McGoldrick 45+2', 49'; Chambers (yellow card) 57'; Cresswell (yellow card) 65'; Emmanuel-Thomas 68'	Report	Lees (red card) 32'; Varney (yellow card) 45+1'; White (yellow card) 82'; Norris (yellow card) 90+2'	Attendance: 20,402; Referee: Attwell

==== April ====
2 April 2013 40	Millwall	0–0	Ipswich Town	The Den
15:00	Chaplow (yellow card) 4'; Marquis (yellow card) 6'; Trotter (yellow card) 65'	Report	Hyam (yellow card) 45'; N'Daw (yellow card) 50'	Attendance: 10,141; Referee: Stroud

6 April 2013 41	Derby County	0–1	Ipswich Town	Pride Park Stadium
15:00	Forsyth (yellow card) 81'	Report	Stearman (yellow card) 27'; Smith (yellow card) 39'; Edwards 90+3'	Attendance: 10,141; Referee: Ilderton

13 April 2013 42	Ipswich Town	1–2	Hull City	Portman Road
15:00	Chopra (yellow card) 30'; Wordsworth 55'	Report	Brady 28'; Evans (yellow card) 37'; Koren 83'	Attendance: 21,988; Referee: Langford

16 April 2013 43	Ipswich Town	3–0	Crystal Palace	Portman Road
19:45	N'Daw (yellow card) 35'; Nouble 37', 45+4'; Cresswell 45+2'; Hyam (yellow card) 48'; Emmanuel-Thomas (yellow card) 55'; Stearman (yellow card) 81'	Report	Ward (yellow card) 34'; Zaha (yellow card) 49'; Delaney (yellow card) 51'	Attendance: 17,656; Referee: Hooper

20 April 2013 44	Sheffield Wednesday	1–1	Ipswich Town	Hillsborough Stadium
15:00	Lita 58'	Report	Tabb 12'	Attendance: 23,630; Referee: Eltrigham

27 April 2013 45	Ipswich Town	3–1	Birmingham City	Portman Road
15:00	Edwards 6'; Chambers 17'; Murphy 57'; Smith (yellow card) 76'; Martin (yellow card) 90+3'	Report	Burke 89'	Attendance: 21,921; Referee: Salisbury

==== May ====
4 May 2013 46	Burnley	2–0	Ipswich Town	Turf Moor
12:45	Stock (yellow card) 45'; Stanislas 60'; Paterson 87'	Report		Attendance: 12,820; Referee: Russell

=== FA Cup ===
5 January 2013 Third round	Aston Villa	2–1	Ipswich Town	Villa Park
15:00	Bent 46'; Weimann 83'	Report	Kisnorbo (yellow card) 12'; Chopra 31'; Hyam (yellow card) 81'	Attendance: 24,854; Referee: Moss

=== Football League Cup ===
14 August 2012 First round	Ipswich Town	3–1	Bristol Rovers	Portman Road
19:45	Scotland 40'; Smith 56'; Creswell 84'	Report	Smith 26'	Attendance: 8,645; Referee: Graham

28 August 2012 Second round	Carlisle United	2–1	Ipswich Town	Brunton Park
19.45	Edwards (yellow card) 22'; Berrett (yellow card) 43'; Beck 90'; Symington 99'	Report	Luongo 23'	Attendance: 3,296; Referee: Mathieson

== Transfers ==
=== Transfers in ===
Date	Position	Nationality	Name	From	Fee	Ref.
30 May 2012	RB	(Wales)	Elliott Hewitt	(England) Macclesfield Town	Undisclosed	
1 July 2012	CM	(France)	Cheick Kourouma	(Italy) Genoa	Free transfer	
9 July 2012	CB	(England)	Luke Chambers	(England) Nottingham Forest	Free transfer	
19 July 2012	GK	(England)	Scott Loach	(England) Watford	Undisclosed	
31 August 2012	CF	(England)	Paul Taylor	(England) Peterborough United	Undisclosed	
14 October 2012	DM	(England)	Nigel Reo-Coker	Free agent	Free transfer	
13 November 2012	LB	(Central African Republic)	Kelly Youga	Free agent	Free transfer	
13 December 2012	LB	(England)	Tyrone Mings	(England) Chippenham Town	£10,000	
8 January 2013	CF	(England)	Frank Nouble	(England) Wolverhampton Wanderers	Undisclosed	
30 January 2013	CM	(England)	Anthony Wordsworth	(England) Colchester United	Undisclosed	
28 March 2013	GK	(Wales)	Jason Brown	Free agent	Free transfer	

=== Loans in ===
Date from	Position	Nationality	Name	From	Date until	Ref.
24 July 2012	CM	(Australia)	Massimo Luongo	(England) Tottenham Hotspur	30 June 2013	
24 August 2012	DM	(Senegal)	Guirane N'Daw	(France) Saint-Étienne	30 June 2013	
31 August 2012	CF	(Republic of Ireland)	Daryl Murphy	(Scotland) Celtic	30 June 2013	
4 October 2012	CM	(England)	Richie Wellens	(England) Leicester City	11 November 2012	
5 October 2012	CF	(England)	DJ Campbell	(England) Queens Park Rangers	2 January 2013	
5 October 2012	CB	(France)	Bilel Mohsni	(England) Southend United	1 January 2013	
16 October 2012	GK	(Republic of Ireland)	Stephen Henderson	(England) West Ham United	2 January 2013	
31 October 2012	CB	(England)	Danny Higginbotham	(England) Stoke City	1 January 2013	
14 November 2012	RB	(England)	Bradley Orr	(England) Blackburn Rovers	27 January 2013	
19 November 2012	CF	(England)	Tyrone Barnett	(England) Peterborough United	13 December 2012	
3 January 2013	CB	(Australia)	Patrick Kisnorbo	(England) Leeds United	30 June 2013	
4 January 2013	CF	(England)	Aaron McLean	(England) Hull City	30 June 2013	
4 January 2013	CF	(England)	David McGoldrick	(England) Nottingham Forest	30 June 2013	
29 January 2013	RB	(England)	Richard Stearman	(England) Wolverhampton Wanderers	30 June 2013	
31 January 2013	GK	(Republic of Ireland)	Stephen Henderson	(England) West Ham United	30 March 2013	
25 February 2013	CB	(England)	Reece Brown	(England) Manchester United	30 June 2013	
7 March 2013	LM	(Republic of Ireland)	Jay Tabb	(England) Reading	5 May 2013	

=== Transfers out ===
Date	Position	Nationality	Name	To	Fee	Ref.
1 July 2012	CB	(Senegal)	Ibrahima Sonko	(Turkey) Akhisar Belediyespor	Free transfer	
1 July 2012	CM	(England)	Jimmy Bullard	(England) Milton Keynes Dons	Free transfer	
1 July 2012	GK	(England)	Richard Wright	(England) Preston North End	Free transfer	
1 July 2012	CM	(England)	Grant Leadbitter	(England) Middlesbrough	Free transfer	
1 July 2012	CM	(England)	Lee Bowyer	Retired		
1 July 2012	LB	(Republic of Ireland)	Mark Kennedy	Retired		
1 July 2012	GK	(United States)	Cody Cropper	(England) Southampton	Free transfer	
23 August 2012	RB	(Canada)	Jaime Peters	Free agent	Mutual consent	
30 August 2012	CB	(Republic of Ireland)	Damien Delaney	(England) Crystal Palace	Free transfer	
31 August 2012	AM	(Scotland)	Ryan Stevenson	(Scotland) Heart of Midlothian	Free transfer	
23 November 2012	CM	(Republic of Ireland)	Colin Healy	Free agent	Mutual consent	
21 December 2012	CM	(France)	Cheick Kourouma	Free agent	Released	
12 January 2013	DM	(England)	Nigel Reo-Coker	(United States) Vancouver Whitecaps	Mutual Consent	
28 January 2013	CF	(Trinidad and Tobago)	Jason Scotland	(England) Barnsley	Free transfer	
31 January 2013	CF	(England)	Nathan Ellington	Free agent	Mutual Consent	
11 March 2013	LB	(Central African Republic)	Kelly Youga	Free agent	Released	

=== Loans out ===
Date from	Position	Nationality	Name	To	Date until	Ref.
16 November 2012	CF	(England)	Nathan Ellington	(England) Scunthorpe United	6 January 2013	
10 January 2013	CF	(Republic of Ireland)	Ronan Murray	(England) Plymouth Argyle	28 April 2013	
12 February 2013	RB	(England)	Joe Whight	(England) Chelmsford City	30 June 2013	
26 February 2013	RB	(England)	Jack Ainsley	(England) Chelmsford City	30 June 2013	
14 March 2013	LW	(Northern Ireland)	Josh Carson	(England) York City	15 April 2013	
30 March 2013	CF	(England)	Tom Winter	(England) Leiston	30 June 2013	

== Squad statistics ==
All statistics updated as of end of season

=== Appearances and goals ===
No.	Pos	Nat	Player	Total		Championship		FA Cup		League Cup	
No.	Pos	Nat	Player	Apps	Goals	Apps	Goals	Apps	Goals	Apps	Goals
Goalkeepers
1	GK	(England) ENG	Scott Loach	25	0	22	0	1	0	2	0
12	GK	(England) ENG	Arran Lee-Barrett	0	0	0	0	0	0	0	0
13	GK	(Wales) WAL	Jason Brown	0	0	0	0	0	0	0	0
Defenders
2	DF	(Wales) WAL	Elliott Hewitt	8	0	2+5	0	1	0	0	0
3	DF	(England) ENG	Aaron Cresswell	49	4	46	3	1	0	2	1
4	DF	(England) ENG	Luke Chambers	46	3	44	3	0	0	2	0
5	DF	(England) ENG	Richard Stearman	15	0	15	0	0	0	0	0
6	DF	(Australia) AUS	Patrick Kisnorbo	4	0	1+2	0	1	0	0	0
15	DF	(England) ENG	Tyrone Mings	1	0	1	0	0	0	0	0
20	DF	(New Zealand) NZL	Tommy Smith	41	4	37+1	3	1	0	2	1
21	DF	(England) ENG	Reece Brown	1	0	0+1	0	0	0	0	0
29	DF	(England) ENG	Jack Ainsley	3	0	1+1	0	0	0	0+1	0
Midfielders
7	MF	(Trinidad and Tobago) TTO	Carlos Edwards	46	3	42+1	3	0+1	0	2	0
8	MF	(Senegal) SEN	Guirane N'Daw	34	1	32+2	1	0	0	0	0
11	MF	(England) ENG	Lee Martin	37	0	33+1	0	1	0	2	0
14	MF	(England) ENG	Anthony Wordsworth	7	1	2+5	1	0	0	0	0
17	MF	(England) ENG	Andy Drury	30	0	20+9	0	0	0	1	0
18	MF	(Republic of Ireland) IRL	Jay Tabb	9	1	7+2	1	0	0	0	0
19	MF	(England) ENG	Luke Hyam	32	1	26+4	1	1	0	1	0
22	MF	(Northern Ireland) NIR	Josh Carson	7	0	3+3	0	0	0	1	0
32	MF	(Northern Ireland) NIR	Cormac Burke	1	0	0	0	0	0	0+1	0
Forwards
9	FW	(England) ENG	Jay Emmanuel-Thomas	32	2	10+19	2	1	0	2	0
10	FW	(England) ENG	Michael Chopra	36	5	14+19	4	1	1	2	0
16	FW	(England) ENG	David McGoldrick	14	4	13	4	0+1	0	0	0
25	FW	(England) ENG	Aaron McLean	8	1	4+3	1	0+1	0	0	0
26	FW	(England) ENG	Paul Taylor	3	0	3	0	0	0	0	0
27	FW	(Republic of Ireland) IRL	Daryl Murphy	40	7	32+7	7	1	0	0	0
28	FW	(Republic of Ireland) IRL	Ronan Murray	1	0	0+1	0	0	0	0	0
34	FW	(England) ENG	Jack Marriott	1	0	0+1	0	0	0	0	0
35	FW	(England) ENG	Frank Nouble	17	2	6+11	2	0	0	0	0
Players transferred out during the season
5	DF	(Republic of Ireland) IRL	Damien Delaney	1	0	0+1	0	0	0	0	0
5	FW	(England) ENG	DJ Campbell	17	10	17	10	0	0	0	0
6	DF	(England) ENG	Danny Higginbotham	12	0	11+1	0	0	0	0	0
13	GK	(Republic of Ireland) IRL	Stephen Henderson	24	0	24	0	0	0	0	0
14	FW	(Trinidad and Tobago) TTO	Jason Scotland	14	2	2+10	1	0	0	1+1	1
15	MF	(Australia) AUS	Massimo Luongo	11	1	6+3	0	0	0	2	1
16	MF	(Scotland) SCO	Ryan Stevenson	2	0	0	0	0	0	0+2	0
16	MF	(England) ENG	Richie Wellens	7	0	7	0	0	0	0	0
18	FW	(England) ENG	Nathan Ellington	2	0	0+2	0	0	0	0	0
21	DF	(France) FRA	Bilel Mohsni	5	0	0+5	0	0	0	0	0
23	MF	(England) ENG	Nigel Reo-Coker	11	0	8+2	0	1	0	0	0
24	DF	(England) ENG	Bradley Orr	13	0	13	0	0	0	0	0
25	FW	(England) ENG	Tyrone Barnett	3	0	2+1	0	0	0	0	0

Last updated: end of season
Source: Competitions

=== Goalscorers ===
No.	Pos.	Nat.	Name	Championship	FA Cup	League Cup	Total
5	FW	(England)	DJ Campbell	10	0	0	10
27	FW	(Republic of Ireland)	Daryl Murphy	7	0	0	7
10	FW	(England)	Michael Chopra	4	1	0	5
20	DF	(New Zealand)	Tommy Smith	3	0	1	4
16	FW	(England)	David McGoldrick	4	0	0	4
3	DF	(England)	Aaron Cresswell	3	0	1	4
4	DF	(England)	Luke Chambers	3	0	0	3
7	MF	(Trinidad and Tobago)	Carlos Edwards	3	0	0	3
14	FW	(Trinidad and Tobago)	Jason Scotland	1	0	1	2
9	FW	(England)	Jay Emmanuel-Thomas	2	0	0	2
35	FW	(England)	Frank Nouble	2	0	0	2
15	MF	(Australia)	Massimo Luongo	0	0	1	1
8	MF	(Senegal)	Guirane N'Daw	1	0	0	1
19	MF	(England)	Luke Hyam	1	0	0	1
25	FW	(England)	Aaron McLean	1	0	0	1
14	MF	(England)	Anthony Wordsworth	1	0	0	1
18	MF	(Republic of Ireland)	Jay Tabb	1	0	0	1
Own goal				1	0	0	1
Total				47	1	3	51

=== Clean sheets ===
No.	Nat	Player	Championship	FA Cup	League Cup	Total
13	(Republic of Ireland)	Stephen Henderson	8	0	0	8
1	(England)	Scott Loach	7	0	0	7
Total			7	0	0	7

=== Disciplinary record ===
No.	Pos.	Nat.	Name	Championship		FA Cup		League Cup		Total	
No.	Pos.	Nat.	Name	Yellow card	Red card	Yellow card	Red card	Yellow card	Red card	Yellow card	Red card
11	MF	(England)	Lee Martin	7	1	0	0	0	0	7	1
8	MF	(Senegal)	Guirane N'Daw	6	0	0	0	0	0	6	0
19	MF	(England)	Luke Hyam	5	0	1	0	0	0	6	0
10	FW	(England)	Michael Chopra	5	0	0	0	0	0	5	0
5	DF	(England)	Richard Stearman	3	1	0	0	0	0	3	1
4	DF	(England)	Luke Chambers	3	0	0	0	0	0	3	0
17	MF	(England)	Andy Drury	3	0	0	0	0	0	3	0
20	DF	(New Zealand)	Tommy Smith	3	0	0	0	0	0	3	0
3	DF	(England)	Aaron Cresswell	2	0	0	0	0	0	2	0
5	FW	(England)	DJ Campbell	2	0	0	0	0	0	2	0
9	FW	(England)	Jay Emmanuel-Thomas	2	0	0	0	0	0	2	0
15	MF	(Australia)	Massimo Luongo	2	0	0	0	0	0	2	0
23	MF	(England)	Nigel Reo-Coker	2	0	0	0	0	0	2	0
24	DF	(England)	Bradley Orr	2	0	0	0	0	0	2	0
6	DF	(Australia)	Patrick Kisnorbo	0	0	1	0	0	0	1	0
13	GK	(Republic of Ireland)	Stephen Henderson	1	0	0	0	0	0	1	0
16	MF	(England)	Richie Wellens	1	0	0	0	0	0	1	0
21	DF	(France)	Bilel Mohsni	1	0	0	0	0	0	1	0
27	FW	(Republic of Ireland)	Daryl Murphy	1	0	0	0	0	0	1	0
Total				49	2	2	0	0	0	51	2

== Awards ==
=== Player awards ===
Award	Player	Ref
Player of the Year	(New Zealand) Tommy Smith	
Players' Player of the Year	(England) Luke Chambers	
Young Player of the Year	(England) Jack Marriott	
Goal of the Season	(England) Aaron Cresswell	
