= Cormac Burke =

Northern Irish association footballer

Personal information
- Date of birth: 11 August 1993 (age 33)
- Place of birth: Derry, Northern Ireland
- Height: 5 ft 8 in (1.73 m)
- Position: Midfielder

Team information
- Current team: Institute
- Number: 10

Senior career*
| Years | Team | Apps | (Gls) |
| 2012–2013 | Ipswich Town | 0 | (0) |
| 2014 | Derry City | 2 | (0) |
| 2014–2015 | Institute | 19 | (1) |
| 2015–2019 | Dungannon Swifts | 106 | (10) |
| 2019 | Coleraine | 7 | (1) |
| 2019– | Institute | 80 | (3) |

International career
| 2008–2009 | Northern Ireland U17 | 8 | (0) |
| 2011 | Northern Ireland U19 | 2 | (0) |
- * Club domestic league appearances and goals

Cormac Burke (born 11 August 1993) is a Northern Irish footballer, who plays for NIFL Championship club Institute.

== Club career ==
=== Ipswich Town ===
He made his debut for the club aged 19 years on 14 August 2012, coming on as a substitute in the first round of the League Cup against Bristol Rovers.

=== Institute ===
He then signed for newly promoted NIFL Championship winners Institute in August 2014, making his debut for the club from the bench in a 1–1 home league draw with Linfield. He scored his first goal for the club two nights later in a 2–0 league cup win over Dollingstown. His first league goal for the club came in April 2015 in a 1–1 draw away to Dungannon Swifts in the NIFL Premiership.

=== Dungannon Swifts ===
Burke signed for NIFL Premiership club Dungannon Swifts in late May 2015.

=== Coleraine ===
Burke completed a move to NIFL Premiership club Coleraine in January 2019 to link up with Rodney McAree after penning a 2 1/2-year deal.

=== Institute return ===
After a short stint at Coleraine, Burke returned to former club Institute on 31 August 2019, scoring his first goal since his return; the opening goal of a 2-2 away draw with former club Dungannon Swifts in the NIFL Premiership, on 21 December 2019.

Following the curtailment of the league season and the resultant relegation of the club in the 2019-20 season, Burke was appointed as the new captain of the club, following the departure of Dean Curry to fellow NIFL Championship club Ballinamallard United.
