= 1998–99 Irish League =

Irish League Premier Division
- Season: 1998–99
- Champions: Glentoran; 20th Irish title
- Relegated: Omagh Town
- Matches played: 180
- Goals scored: 462 (2.57 per match)
- Top goalscorer: Vinny Arkins (19 goals)

The 1998–99 Irish League was the 98th edition of the Irish League, the highest level of league competition in Northern Irish football. The league consisted of 10 teams, and Glentoran won the championship.

== Premier Division ==
Location of teams in the 1998–99 Irish League Premier Division
Location of the Belfast-based teams in the 1998–99 Irish League Premier Division

=== League standings ===
Pos	Team	Pld	W	D	L	GF	GA	GD	Pts	Qualification or Relegation
1	Glentoran (C)	36	24	6	6	74	35	+39	78	Qualification for the Champions League first qualifying round
2	Linfield	36	20	10	6	68	39	+29	70	Qualification for the UEFA Cup first qualifying round
3	Crusaders	36	18	8	10	48	39	+9	62	
4	Newry Town	36	17	9	10	52	46	+6	60	Qualification for the Intertoto Cup first round
5	Glenavon	36	13	12	11	49	35	+14	51	
6	Ballymena United	36	11	8	17	40	42	−2	41	
7	Coleraine	36	10	9	17	34	53	−19	39	
8	Portadown	36	9	10	17	41	47	−6	37	Qualification for the UEFA Cup first qualifying round
9	Cliftonville	36	7	14	15	31	47	−16	35	Qualification for the promotion/relegation play-off
10	Omagh Town (R)	36	5	6	25	25	79	−54	21	Relegation to the First Division

Source: rsssf.com
(C) Champions; (R) Relegated

=== Results ===
==== Matches 1–18 ====
Home \ Away	BLM	CLI	COL	CRU	GLV	GLT	LIN	NEW	OMA	POR
Ballymena United		1–2	0–1	1–2	0–1	1–1	1–0	0–0	0–0	1–0
Cliftonville	0–1		0–0	1–1	0–0	0–0	0–1	0–2	2–1	0–0
Coleraine	0–1	1–1		0–2	0–0	0–1	0–0	2–2	1–0	0–2
Crusaders	1–0	1–0	0–1		1–0	0–0	1–4	2–0	2–0	0–0
Glenavon	0–0	0–0	3–1	2–0		0–1	1–1	1–1	2–0	1–0
Glentoran	1–0	0–1	5–0	1–4	1–0		0–1	1–3	2–0	1–0
Linfield	1–0	1–0	1–1	2–1	2–0	1–1		2–1	2–0	2–2
Newry Town	0–0	1–0	1–0	0–0	0–2	1–0	2–1		0–2	1–2
Omagh Town	0–5	1–1	1–1	0–0	0–3	0–2	1–3	1–3		1–0
Portadown	1–3	0–1	1–2	0–0	1–1	0–3	0–2	2–1	2–0	

Source: Irish League Archive
Legend: Blue = home team win; Yellow = draw; Red = away team win.

==== Matches 19–36 ====
Home \ Away	BLM	CLI	COL	CRU	GLV	GLT	LIN	NEW	OMA	POR
Ballymena United		2–2	1–0	2–0	1–0	3–6	4–2	1–1	1–2	2–2
Cliftonville	1–0		1–1	2–3	2–2	2–4	1–1	1–4	2–1	0–2
Coleraine	2–1	3–1		0–2	1–3	1–3	2–1	3–0	2–1	1–0
Crusaders	2–0	2–1	2–0		1–1	0–3	3–2	3–2	5–0	1–1
Glenavon	1–0	0–1	3–1	3–0		0–1	2–2	1–2	6–1	2–2
Glentoran	2–1	1–1	5–4	2–1	5–2		1–2	5–1	2–0	3–1
Linfield	4–1	2–1	2–1	4–2	3–1	1–1		2–2	3–0	3–1
Newry Town	1–0	2–1	1–1	3–0	1–0	1–2	2–1		1–1	3–2
Omagh Town	1–4	2–2	2–0	1–2	0–3	1–4	1–5	2–3		1–0
Portadown	2–1	3–0	3–0	0–1	2–2	1–3	1–1	2–3	3–0	

Source: Irish League Archive
Legend: Blue = home team win; Yellow = draw; Red = away team win.

== First Division ==
Irish League First Division
- Champions: Distillery
- Promoted: Distillery
- Matches played: 112
- Goals scored: 325 (2.9 per match)

Location of teams in the 1998–99 Irish League First Division

=== League standings ===
Pos	Team	Pld	W	D	L	GF	GA	GD	Pts	Qualification or Promotion
1	Distillery (C, P)	28	17	4	7	44	30	+14	55	Promotion to the Premier Division
2	Ards	28	16	1	11	47	34	+13	49	Qualification for the promotion/relegation play-off
3	Bangor	28	15	3	10	37	35	+2	48	
4	Ballyclare Comrades	28	11	5	12	55	44	+11	38	
5	Dungannon Swifts	28	11	5	12	36	46	−10	38	
6	Carrick Rangers	28	10	4	14	41	41	0	34	
7	Larne	28	9	5	14	28	32	−4	32	
8	Limavady United	28	6	7	15	37	63	−26	25	

Source: rsssf.com
(C) Champions; (P) Promoted

== Promotion/relegation play-off ==
Cliftonville, who finished in the relegation play-off place, faced Ards, the 2nd-placed team in the First Division, in a two-legged tie for a place in next season's Irish League Premier Division.

5 May 1999

Ards	0 – 1	Cliftonville

Castlereagh Park, Newtownards

8 May 1999

Cliftonville	4 – 2	Ards

Solitude, Belfast

Cliftonville won 5–2 on aggregate
