= 1996–97 Irish League =

Irish League Premier Division
- Season: 1996–97
- Champions: Crusaders; 4th Irish title
- Matches played: 112
- Goals scored: 274 (2.45 per match)
- Top goalscorer: Gary Haylock (16 goals)

The 1996–97 Irish League was the 96th edition of the Irish League, the highest level of league competition in Northern Irish football. The league consisted of 8 teams, and Crusaders won the championship.

== Premier Division ==
Location of teams in the 1996–97 Irish League Premier Division
Location of the Belfast-based teams in the 1996–97 Irish League Premier Division

=== League standings ===
Pos	Team	Pld	W	D	L	GF	GA	GD	Pts	Qualification or Relegation
1	Crusaders (C)	28	12	10	6	39	26	+13	46	Qualification for the Champions League first qualifying round
2	Coleraine	28	10	13	5	37	31	+6	43	Qualification for the UEFA Cup first qualifying round
3	Glentoran	28	10	11	7	36	30	+6	41	
4	Portadown	28	10	8	10	36	32	+4	38	
5	Linfield	28	10	8	10	35	33	+2	38	
6	Glenavon	28	8	11	9	35	34	+1	35	Qualification for the UEFA Cup Winners' Cup qualifying round
7	Cliftonville	28	7	9	12	23	38	−15	30	
8	Ards	28	5	10	13	33	50	−17	25	Promotion/relegation play-off and Intertoto Cup group stage

Source: rsssf.com
(C) Champions

=== Results ===
==== Matches 1–14 ====
Home \ Away	ARD	CLI	COL	CRU	GLV	GLT	LIN	POR
Ards		0–1	1–4	0–0	0–0	3–0	2–3	2–2
Cliftonville	0–1		0–1	0–2	0–0	0–2	0–3	0–0
Coleraine	0–0	0–1		1–0	1–1	0–0	1–1	0–2
Crusaders	2–2	2–1	0–0		1–0	1–1	0–1	2–0
Glenavon	1–1	1–0	1–1	0–0		1–2	2–1	1–0
Glentoran	0–0	1–1	1–0	1–1	2–1		0–2	2–0
Linfield	0–0	1–1	0–1	0–0	0–2	0–0		0–2
Portadown	0–1	1–0	2–2	0–2	1–1	0–1	0–0	

Source: Irish League Archive
Legend: Blue = home team win; Yellow = draw; Red = away team win.

==== Matches 15–28 ====
Home \ Away	ARD	CLI	COL	CRU	GLV	GLT	LIN	POR
Ards		0–2	3–3	1–5	2–2	4–3	4–1	2–3
Cliftonville	2–1		1–1	1–1	2–0	1–0	2–4	1–1
Coleraine	1–0	1–1		3–1	1–1	3–2	1–3	1–1
Crusaders	3–1	3–0	1–1		2–2	2–3	3–0	2–1
Glenavon	2–1	4–0	2–3	1–2		2–1	3–1	1–2
Glentoran	2–0	1–1	1–0	4–0	2–2		1–1	2–3
Linfield	3–1	2–3	2–3	0–1	3–0	0–0		1–0
Portadown	5–0	4–1	2–3	1–0	2–1	1–1	0–2	

Source: Irish League Archive
Legend: Blue = home team win; Yellow = draw; Red = away team win.

== First Division ==
Irish League First Division
- Champions: Ballymena United
- Promoted: Ballymena United; Omagh Town
- Matches played: 112
- Goals scored: 298 (2.66 per match)

Location of teams in the 1996–97 Irish League First Division

=== League standings ===
Pos	Team	Pld	W	D	L	GF	GA	GD	Pts	Qualification or Promotion
1	Ballymena United (C, P)	28	21	2	5	49	17	+32	65	Promotion to the Premier Division
2	Omagh Town (P)	28	15	5	8	40	39	+1	50	Promotion to the Premier Division
3	Bangor	28	15	4	9	42	29	+13	49	Qualification for the promotion/relegation play-off
4	Ballyclare Comrades	28	11	4	13	44	42	+2	37	
5	Newry Town	28	10	5	13	32	35	−3	35	
6	Distillery	28	10	4	14	31	37	−6	34	
7	Larne	28	9	5	14	34	48	−14	32	
8	Carrick Rangers	28	5	3	20	26	51	−25	18	

Source: rsssf.com
(C) Champions; (P) Promoted

== Promotion/relegation play-off ==
Omagh Town, who finished in the relegation play-off place, faced Bangor, the 2nd-placed team in the First Division, in a two-legged tie for a place in next season's Irish League Premier Division.

29 April 1997

Bangor	0 – 1	Ards

Clandeboye Park, Bangor

2 May 1997

Ards	1 – 0	Bangor

Castlereagh Park, Newtownards

Ards won 2–0 on aggregate
