= Seán Webb =

Northern Irish footballer (born 1983)

Personal information
- Full name: Seán Michael Webb
- Date of birth: 4 January 1983 (age 43)
- Place of birth: Coalisland, Northern Ireland
- Position: Defender

Senior career*
Years	Team	Apps	(Gls)
1999–2000	Dungannon Swifts	?	(?)
2000–2004	Ross County	49	(1)
2004–2005	St Johnstone	19	(0)
2005–2007	Ross County	35	(1)
2007–2008	Accrington Stanley	18	(0)
2008	Þór Akureyri	9	(0)
2008	Fleetwood Town	0	(0)
2009	Shamrock Rovers	10	(0)
2012–2016	Nairn County		
2016–2017	Huntly		
2017–2020	Clachnacuddin		

International career
2003–2005	Northern Ireland U21	6	(1)
2006–2007	Northern Ireland	4	(0)
- * Club domestic league appearances and goals

Seán Michael Webb (born 4 January 1983 in Coalisland, County Tyrone) is a Northern Irish footballer.

== Career ==
=== Club career ===
Webb began his career with Dungannon Swifts, where he came through the youth team and debuted at 16 years old in December 1999. In September 2000, he moved to Scottish Football League club Ross County, where he initially joined the Under-19 team. He made his first team debut in August 2001 in a 2–0 win at Dumbarton. He went on to make 49 league appearances, scoring one goal before signing for St Johnstone in June 2004, and made nineteen league appearances for the Saints, before moving back to Ross County in 2005, where he stayed until 2007, making a further 35 league appearances, and again scoring one goal. On 31 August 2007, he signed for English Football League Two club Accrington Stanley, initially on a four-month loan deal, which was extended to a full-season permanent deal. He made league appearances in one season and was released at the end of the 2007–08 season. In 2008, he signed for Icelandic club Þór Akureyri.

On 23 October 2008, Webb signed for Conference North club Fleetwood Town. He made his debut two days later as a second-half substitute in the FA Cup fourth qualifying round as Fleetwood beat Nantwich Town 4–3 to reach the First round proper. Webb came on after 57 minutes, replacing John Hills. However, that was to be his only appearance for the club, and on 14 November 2008, he was released.

Webb signed for Shamrock Rovers on 25 February 2009. He played in the opening game in Tallaght Stadium before being released in the summer.

In April 2012, Webb signed for Nairn County F.C. .

=== International career ===
Webb has been capped at Under-18, Under-19, Under-21 and senior levels by Northern Ireland.

He made his full international debut during Northern Ireland's tour of the United States in May 2006. He played the final eight minutes in a 1–0 defeat to Uruguay and featured against Romania on the same tour. He added two caps with substitute appearances against Wales and Sweden in 2007 spring. On 14 July 2007, he appeared for a Northern Ireland Select against Everton in a match to celebrate the 25th Anniversary of the Milk Cup. Although Webb's last international call-up was in early 2008, he has not been capped since 2007 when he appeared as a substitute against Sweden.
