= 2000–01 Irish League =

Irish League Premier Division
- Season: 2000–01
- Champions: Linfield; 44th Irish title
- Relegated: Ballymena United
- Matches played: 180
- Goals scored: 507 (2.82 per match)
- Top goalscorer: Davy Larmour (17 goals)

The 2000–01 Irish League was the 100th edition of the Irish League, the highest level of league competition in Northern Irish football. The league consisted of 10 teams, and Linfield won the championship.

== Premier Division ==
Location of teams in the 2000–01 Irish League Premier Division
Location of the Belfast-based teams in the 2000–01 Irish League Premier Division

=== League standings ===
Pos	Team	Pld	W	D	L	GF	GA	GD	Pts	Qualification or Relegation
1	Linfield (C)	36	22	9	5	75	31	+44	75	Qualification for the Champions League first qualifying round
2	Glenavon	36	18	8	10	56	42	+14	62	Qualification for the UEFA Cup qualifying round
3	Glentoran	36	15	12	9	52	37	+15	57	Qualification for the UEFA Cup qualifying round
4	Coleraine	36	14	11	11	48	44	+4	53	
5	Cliftonville	36	12	11	13	53	57	−4	47	Qualification for the Intertoto Cup first round
6	Newry Town	36	12	8	16	42	55	−13	44	
7	Omagh Town	36	11	10	15	48	54	−6	43	
8	Portadown	36	10	11	15	48	60	−12	41	
9	Crusaders	36	8	11	17	44	59	−15	35	Qualification for the promotion/relegation play-off
10	Ballymena United (R)	36	9	7	20	41	68	−27	34	Relegation to the First Division

Source: rsssf.com
(C) Champions; (R) Relegated

=== Results ===
==== Matches 1–18 ====
Home \ Away	BLM	CLI	COL	CRU	GLV	GLT	LIN	NEW	OMA	POR
Ballymena United		2–1	0–1	0–1	1–0	0–3	1–1	0–1	1–2	1–1
Cliftonville	2–2		1–0	0–3	2–1	1–0	1–3	1–0	1–2	0–0
Coleraine	0–2	2–2		1–2	0–1	1–1	1–0	2–1	0–0	1–0
Crusaders	2–3	0–4	1–1		0–2	0–1	0–2	1–3	0–0	0–1
Glenavon	2–1	1–0	1–1	1–0		0–0	0–1 (Note: The 1st round match between Glenavon and Linfield (originally finished 0–0) was rated 0–1. Glenavon had substituted an ineligible player.)	0–1	3–0	1–2
Glentoran	1–1	1–0	1–1	1–1	1–1		0–1	0–0	1–2	3–1
Linfield	2–2	3–0	0–3	0–0	3–0	1–1		1–3	1–1	0–0
Newry Town	0–2	0–3	0–0	2–0	1–2	0–0	0–0		0–2	0–0
Omagh Town	0–1	0–1	1–2	0–2	1–1	1–3	0–0	2–2		0–0
Portadown	1–0	0–2	0–1	1–1	0–0	0–3	0–3	2–0	1–2	

Source: Irish League Archive
Legend: Blue = home team win; Yellow = draw; Red = away team win.

==== Matches 19–36 ====
Home \ Away	BLM	CLI	COL	CRU	GLV	GLT	LIN	NEW	OMA	POR
Ballymena United		2–2	0–1	2–1	1–2	1–3	1–5	1–0	2–1	3–3
Cliftonville	3–1		1–1	1–1	4–2	1–1	1–4	2–2	2–2	5–3
Coleraine	1–0	3–1		2–2	0–2	5–2	1–1	5–2	1–3	3–3
Crusaders	3–1	1–2	2–3		4–3	1–1	1–3	2–2	2–1	2–1
Glenavon	4–0	1–0	2–1	1–1		3–0	0–4	1–0	3–0	3–3
Glentoran	2–1	4–0	0–1	2–0	2–2		2–0	1–0	2–0	4–1
Linfield	4–1	4–2	3–1	3–1	4–2	2–0		2–0	3–2	4–1
Newry Town	5–2	2–1	2–0	3–2	1–4	1–3	0–2		1–0	4–3
Omagh Town	4–0	2–2	3–1	2–2	1–2	2–1	1–5	2–3		2–1
Portadown	3–2	1–1	1–0	3–2	1–2	4–1	1–0	4–0	1–4	

Source: Irish League Archive
Legend: Blue = home team win; Yellow = draw; Red = away team win.

== First Division ==
Irish League First Division
- Champions: Ards
- Promoted: Ards
- Matches played: 180
- Goals scored: 527 (2.93 per match)

Location of teams in the 2000–01 Irish League First Division

=== League standings ===
Pos	Team	Pld	W	D	L	GF	GA	GD	Pts	Qualification or Promotion
1	Ards (C, P)	36	21	10	5	69	31	+38	73	Promotion to the Premier Division
2	Lisburn Distillery	36	20	11	5	66	37	+29	71	Qualification for the promotion/relegation play-off
3	Armagh City	36	19	9	8	74	52	+22	66	
4	Bangor	36	18	9	9	56	42	+14	63	
5	Institute	36	16	7	13	58	48	+10	55	
6	Larne	36	12	9	15	53	62	−9	45	
7	Dungannon Swifts	36	10	11	15	45	48	−3	41	
8	Limavady United	36	9	10	17	37	51	−14	37	
9	Ballyclare Comrades	36	5	8	23	35	69	−34	23	
10	Carrick Rangers	36	6	4	26	34	87	−53	22	

Source: rsssf.com
(C) Champions; (P) Promoted

== Promotion/relegation play-off ==
Crusaders, who finished in the relegation play-off place, faced Lisburn Distillery, the 2nd-placed team in the First Division, in a two-legged tie for a place in next season's Irish League Premier Division.

1 May 2001

Lisburn Distillery	2 – 1	Crusaders

New Grosvenor Stadium, Ballyskeagh

4 May 2001

Crusaders	3 – 1	Lisburn Distillery

Seaview, Belfast

Crusaders won 4–3 on aggregate
