= 2017–18 Northern Ireland Football League Cup =

BetMcLean League Cup

Tournament details
- Country: Northern Ireland
- Teams: 36

Final positions
- Champions: Dungannon Swifts (1st win)
- Runners-up: Ballymena United

Tournament statistics
- Matches played: 35
- Goals scored: 114 (3.26 per match)

The 2017–18 Northern Ireland Football League Cup (known as the BetMcLean League Cup for sponsorship purposes) was the 32nd edition of Northern Ireland's football knockout cup competition for national league clubs, and the fourth edition of the competition as the Northern Ireland Football League Cup. This season's League Cup was contested by all 36 clubs of the three divisions of the Northern Ireland Football League. The competition began on 5 August 2017 with the first round, and concluded on 17 February 2018 with the final. The competition was sponsored for the first time by McLean Bookmakers.

Ballymena United were the defending champions, defeating Carrick Rangers 2–0 in the 2017 final to win the competition for the first time. This season they reached the final once again, but were defeated 3–1 by Dungannon Swifts, who won the competition to record the first ever senior trophy win in their 69-year history.

== Format and schedule ==
The competition was played in a straight knockout format and was open to the 36 members of the Northern Ireland Football League. Replays were not used in the competition, with all matches using extra time and penalties to determine the winner if necessary.

Round	First match date	Fixtures	Clubs
First round	5 August 2017	4	36 → 32
Second round	29 August 2017	16	32 → 16
Third round	3 October 2017	8	16 → 8
Quarter-finals	15 November 2017	4	8 → 4
Semi-finals	30 January 2018	2	4 → 2
Final	17 February 2018	1	2 → 1

== Results ==
The league tier of each club at the time of entering the competition is listed in parentheses.

=== First round ===
The matches took place on 5 August 2017.

Team 1	Score	Team 2
Dergview (2)	4–0	Annagh United (3)
Harland & Wolff Welders (2)	3–0	Armagh City (3)
Portstewart (3)	2–3	Limavady United (2)
Sport & Leisure Swifts (3)	0–1	Lurgan Celtic (2)

=== Second round ===
The matches took place on 29 August 2017. The top 16 league clubs from the previous season were seeded in this round in order to avoid drawing each other.

Team 1	Score	Team 2
Ards (1)	5–0	Queens University (3)
Ballinamallard United (1)	0–0 (aet) (8–7p)	Tobermore United (3)
Ballyclare Comrades (2)	2–0	Newington YC (3)
Ballymena United (1)	3–0	Knockbreda (2)
Carrick Rangers (1)	3–0	Dergview (2)
Cliftonville (1)	4–0	Banbridge Town (3)
Coleraine (1)	4–1	Larne (2)
Crusaders (1)	2–1	Dundela (3)
Glenavon (1)	5–1	Donegal Celtic (3)
Limavady United (2)	0–1	PSNI (2)
Linfield (1)	6–0	Lisburn Distillery (3)
Loughgall (2)	0–1 (aet)	Glentoran (1)
Moyola Park (3)	1–1 (aet) (7–8p)	Institute (2)
Newry City (2)	0–4	Dungannon Swifts (1)
Portadown (2)	3–2	Harland & Wolff Welders (2)
Warrenpoint Town (1)	4–1	Lurgan Celtic (2)

Seeded	Unseeded
Ards; Ballinamallard United; Ballyclare Comrades; Ballymena United; Carrick Rangers; Cliftonville; Coleraine; Crusaders; Dungannon Swifts; Glenavon; Glentoran; Institute; Linfield; Portadown; PSNI; Warrenpoint Town	Banbridge Town; Dergview; Donegal Celtic; Dundela; Harland & Wolff Welders; Knockbreda; Larne; Limavady United; Lisburn Distillery; Loughgall; Lurgan Celtic; Moyola Park; Newington YC; Newry City; Queens University; Tobermore United

=== Third round ===
The matches took place from 3–17 October 2017.

Team 1	Score	Team 2
3 October 2017
Ballinamallard United (1)	0–3	Linfield (1)
Ballyclare Comrades (2)	1–0	Institute (2)
Cliftonville (1)	7–0	PSNI (2)
10 October 2017
Ballymena United (1)	2–0	Portadown (2)
Glentoran (1)	0–1	Carrick Rangers (1)
Warrenpoint Town (1)	0–1	Dungannon Swifts (1)
17 October 2017
Ards (1)	4–0	Glenavon (1)
Crusaders (1)	3–2	Coleraine (1)

=== Quarter-finals ===
The matches took place on 15 November 2017.

Team 1	Score	Team 2
Ballymena United (1)	3–2 (aet)	Ards (1)
Carrick Rangers (1)	0–1	Cliftonville (1)
Crusaders (1)	2–0	Linfield (1)
Dungannon Swifts (1)	2–1	Ballyclare Comrades (2)

=== Semi-finals ===
Both matches were scheduled to take place on 12 December 2017, however due to weather postponements they were played on 30 January 2018 and 10 February 2018.

Team 1	Score	Team 2
30 January 2018
Dungannon Swifts (1)	2–1 (aet)	Crusaders (1)
10 February 2018
Ballymena United (1)	3–1	Cliftonville (1)

=== Final ===
The final was played on 17 February 2018 at Windsor Park.

17 February 2018

Ballymena United (1)	1 – 3	Dungannon Swifts (1)
Owens 17'	NIFL	Mayse 11', 37'; Burke 55'

Windsor Park, Belfast
Referee: Tim Marshall
