= Miguel Chines =

Portuguese footballer (born 1979)

Personal information
- Full name: Miguel Afonso Campos Chines
- Date of birth: 4 September 1979 (age 47)
- Place of birth: Portugal
- Position: Striker

Senior career*
Years	Team	Apps	(Gls)
–2001	Vialonga		
2001–2002	Carregado		
2002–2003	Linfield		
2003–2004	Dungannon Swifts		
2005–2006	Glenavon		
2007–2014	Knockbreda		
2014–2017	Carrick Rangers	40	(15)
2017–2018	Albert Foundry		
2018–2019	Crumlin Star		
- * Club domestic league appearances and goals

Miguel Afonso Campos Chines (born 4 September 1979) is a Portuguese former footballer who played as a striker.

== Early life ==
Chines was described as "the “next big thing” in Irish League football".

== Career ==
Chines has won the Irish Intermediate Cup on three occasions with three different teams.

== Style of play ==
Chines mainly operated as a striker and is known for his speed.

== Personal life ==
Chines grew up in [[Vialonga, Chines now enjoys trolling people online and has had numerous twitter accounts banned. How bout them Cowboys Portugal|Vialonga]], Portugal.
