= Rodney McAree =

Northern Irish footballer and coach

Personal information
- Full name: Rodney Joseph McAree
- Date of birth: 19 August 1974 (age 52)
- Place of birth: Dungannon, Northern Ireland
- Height: 5 ft 7 in (1.70 m)
- Position: Midfielder

Youth career
- 1991–1994: Liverpool

Senior career*
Years	Team	Apps	(Gls)
1994–1995	Bristol City	6	(0)
1995–1998	Fulham	28	(3)
1998	→ Woking (loan)		
1998	Stevenage Borough	3	(0)
- Chesham United
- Crawley Town
- Worthing
2000–2002	Glenavon	33	(3)
2002–2009	Dungannon Swifts	185	(36)
Total		252	(42)

Managerial career
- 2011–2018: Dungannon Swifts
- 2018–2019: Coleraine
- 2023: Glentoran
- 2023–: Dungannon Swifts
- * Club domestic league appearances and goals

Rodney Joseph McAree (born 19 August 1974) is a Northern Irish former footballer and current manager of NIFL Premiership side Dungannon Swifts.

== Playing career ==
McAree began his playing career as a trainee with Liverpool. He then spent a season with Bristol City, before joining Fulham, then in the Football League Third Division. McAree spent four largely uneventful seasons with Fulham, but scored a vital winning goal in the final minute against Carlisle United, which eventually led to Fulham's promotion. Despite only playing a handful of games, McAree became a cult hero, and his name is still occasionally sung by Fulham fans. He had a loan spell at Woking in 1998. He left Fulham and signed for Stevenage Borough in September 1998. He went on to have spells with Chesham United, Crawley Town and Worthing.

In 2000, McAree returned to Northern Ireland, signing for Glenavon making 33 league appearances and scoring 3 goals. In 2002, he joined his hometown club, Dungannon Swifts, who were then managed by his father Joe, who later became chairman. McAree was a vital player for the Swifts, although occasionally suffered from injury problems. He captained Dungannon to promotion to the Irish Premier League in 2003, where they have remained since. He also won the Ulster Cup and Mid-Ulster Cup with the side. In 2007, he led Dungannon out in the Irish Cup final against Linfield, scoring an equaliser in the 40th minute. However, the Swifts became the first ever side to lose an Irish Cup Final on penalties when after a 2–2 scoreline, Linfield were victorious 3–2 in the shootout. McAree converted his penalty in the shootout. McAree retired from playing after a 2–1 defeat to Coleraine on 24 October 2009, but remained at the club in his capacity as first-team coach.

== Coaching career ==
McAree combined playing with Dungannon Swifts with coaching the first team. In December 2011 McAree was appointed as Dungannon's new manager following the departure of Dixie Robinson. However he stepped down a couple of months later after it was revealed he did not possess the necessary coaching badges. He was replaced by Darren Murphy, and became his assistant manager. Upon receiving his coaching qualifications, McAree was appointed as joint manager alongside Murphy, before stepping down from the role in October 2012, citing 'personal reasons'. In July 2013 he returned to the club as first team coach. And in October 2015 he was appointed Head Coach of Dungannon Swifts, following the resignation of Darren Murphy.

During the 2016-17 Season; with the help of 25 goal forward Andrew Mitchell, McAree guided the Swifts to 7th in the Danske Bank Premiership, which earned them a place in the UEFA Europa League play-offs, losing to Ballymena United. The team also reached the Semi Final of the Irish Cup, losing to eventual winners Linfield.McAree managed Dungannon Swifts to their first senior trophy, defeating Ballymena United in the 2018 League Cup Final.

In September 2018, McAree departed the Swifts to become Coleraine manager, succeeding Oran Kearney. After failing to qualify for the Europa League, McAree left the club by mutual consent.

In January 2021, McAree was appointed as a first team coach at Warrenpoint Town, before joining Mick McDermott's coaching staff at Glentoran five months later. On 17 January 2023, McAree was appointed as manager of Glentoran on an 18-month contract.

== Personal life ==
His father Joe, who also managed Dungannon Swifts, was awarded an MBE, in the 2014 New Year Honours List, for services to sport and to the community.

== Honours ==
=== As a player ===
Fulham

- Football League Third Division runner-up: 1996–97

Dungannon Swifts

- Irish League First Division: 2002–03
- Ulster Cup: 2002–03
- Mid-Ulster Cup: 2005–06
- Irish Cup runner-up: 2006–07

=== As a manager ===
Dungannon Swifts

- Irish Cup: 2024–25
- Northern Ireland Football League Cup: 2017–18
- Mid-Ulster Cup: 2015-16
