= Rory Hamill =

Northern Irish footballer (born 1976)

Personal information
- Full name: Rory Hamill
- Date of birth: 4 May 1976 (age 50)
- Place of birth: Coleraine, Northern Ireland
- Position: Forward

Youth career
- 1992–1993: Coleraine

Senior career*
Years	Team	Apps	(Gls)
1993–1994	Southampton	0	(0)
1994–1996	Fulham	48	(7)
1996–2001	Glentoran	144	(29)
2001–2004	Coleraine	94	(28)
2004	Ballymena United	49	(8)
2004–2006	Dungannon Swifts	29	(4)
2007–2008	Glentoran	14	(2)
2008	→ Donegal Celtic (loan)	12	(2)
2008–2010	Cliftonville	29	(6)
2009	→ Lisburn Distillery (loan)	11	(0)
2010	Glenavon	9	(1)
2010–2011	Bangor	20	(5)
2021– 2024	Bangor Swifts		(0)

International career
1995–2003	Northern Ireland B	3	(0)
1999	Northern Ireland	1	(0)
- * Club domestic league appearances and goals as of 23:38, 12 November 2011

Rory Hamill (born 4 May 1976) is a former footballer from Northern Ireland.

== Playing career ==
Rory Hamill had been capped for Northern Ireland youth before joining English Premier League club Southampton as a trainee in 1992. He failed to make the senior team and left for Division Three side Fulham in November 1994. In the first season, he played a total of 25 League and Cup games, scoring seven goals. He was also capped for Northern Ireland B-team cap in a 3–0 defeat by Scotland B in February 1995.

The next season Hamill failed to establish his position in the Fulham first team. In September 1996 he joined Glentoran on loan, a move that became permanent in November. His performance for Glentoran brought him back to the attention of the Northern Ireland set-up and he won his second B cap in a 1–0 defeat by Wales in February 1999.

In April 1999, Hamill was called up to the Northern Ireland full squad by Lawrie McMenemy. He came on as a substitute in a friendly against Canada.

With Glentoran Hamill picked up an Irish League title in 1999 and Irish Cup winner's medals in 1998 and 2000.

A drug test after an UEFA Cup match between Glentoran and Norwegian side Lillestrøm in August 2000 proved positive with traces of cannabis. Initially Hamill was banned from all European competitions, but on the eve of the 2001 Irish Cup Final a ban from all competition was imposed, causing him to miss the Final, and all games up to 4 October 2001.

After 150 League appearances, and 28 goals, Hamill left Glentoran in 2001 for Coleraine. With Coleraine Hamill added another Irish Cup medal. In August 2003 he scored against U.D. Leiria in a 2–1 win in the UEFA Cup. A year later, Hamill moved on to Ballymena United, where he was to become vice-captain.

In 2006, Hamill signed for Dungannon Swifts. He helped the Swifts to their first ever Irish Cup Final appearance in his only season.

In June 2007, Hamill rejoined Glentoran. In October he was a member of the Glens side that won the County Antrim Shield – with a 2–1 win over Crusaders. In January 2008 he joined Donegal Celtic on loan. At the end of the season he switched for Cliftonville. In May 2009 he suffered another Cup Final defeat with the Reds.

After a somewhat disappointing spell with Cliftonville, he moved to Glenavon in February 2010. Championship 1 side Bangor brought Hamill to Clandeboye Park in July 2010. Rory made 19 starting appearances for the Seasiders and scored 5 goals before being released by the club at the end of March 2011.

== Honours ==
- Irish League/Irish Premier League
  - Glentoran 1998/99
- Irish Cup: 3
  - Glentoran 1998, 2000
  - Coleraine F.C. 2003
- County Antrim Shield
  - Glentoran 2007/08
