= Bourneview Mill F.C. =

Association football club in Northern Ireland

- Full name: Bourneview Mill Football Club
- Founded: 1962
- Ground: Pepperton Park
- Coach: (Northern Ireland) Robert Anderson
- League: Mid-Ulster Football League Intermediate B
Home colours

Bourneview Mill Football Club, referred to as Bourneview Mill (formerly known as Bourneview Young Men Football Club) is an intermediate-level football club playing in the Intermediate B division of the Mid-Ulster Football League in Northern Ireland. The club is based in Portadown, County Armagh. They are a member of the Mid-Ulster Football Association and play in the Irish Cup.
