= Newcastle F.C. =

Association football club in Northern Ireland

Newcastle Town FC
- Full name: Newcastle Town Football Club
- Nickname: The Seasiders
- Founded: 1977
- Ground: Bear Park, Newcastle
- Chairman: Adrian Howard
- Manager: Paddy Mulholland
- League: NAFL Division 1B
- 2024-25: NAFL Division 1B

Newcastle Town Football Club is a Northern Irish, intermediate football club based in Newcastle, County Down, Northern Ireland playing in Division 1B of the Northern Amateur Football League.

The club currently has three senior teams: Newcastle Town FC, Newcastle Town Swifts and Newcastle Town Forest. Newcastle Swifts currently play in the Premier Division of the McCalls Newcastle & District league while Newcastle Forest play in Division 2 of the McCalls Newcastle & District league. The club has a number of youth teams playing in the National League, Lisburn Junior Invitational leagues and the Downpatrick Youth Football leagues (DYFL).

The First Team is currently managed by Jonathan Scannell.

In 2024 Newcastle FC merged with Tollymore United FC, forming the current Newcastle Town club.

== Honours ==
- Northern Amateur Football League
  - NAFL Division 1B Champions
    - 2004/5
  - NAFL Division 2A Champions
    - 2002/3
  - NAFL Division 2B Champions
    - 2000/1
  - NAFL Cochrane Corry Cup
    - 2000/1
