= Blackers Mill F.C. =

Blackers Mill
- Full name: Blackers Mill Football Club
- Founded: 1978
- Dissolved: 2013
- Ground: Kingston Memorial Playing Fields; Armagh
| Home colours | Away colours |

Blackers Mill, was an intermediate-level football club playing in the Intermediate A division of the Mid-Ulster Football League in Northern Ireland. The club folded in 2013.
