= Dungannon Swifts F.C. =

Football club in County Tyrone, Northern Ireland

Dungannon Swifts
- Full name: Dungannon Swifts Football Club
- Nickname: The Swifts
- Founded: 1949; 77 years ago
- Ground: Stangmore Park
- Capacity: 1,500
- President: David Flack
- Chairman: Keith Boyd
- Manager: Rodney McAree
- League: NIFL Premiership
- 2025–26: NIFL Premiership, 6th of 12
- Website: dungannonswiftsfc.com
Home colours	Away colours

Dungannon Swifts Football Club, referred to as Dungannon Swifts, or simply The Swifts, is a Northern Irish semi-professional football club playing in the NIFL Premiership. The club, founded in 1949, has risen from the Mid-Ulster league to the top tier in Northern Ireland since its election to the Irish League First Division in 1997. Dungannon earned promotion from Irish League First Division to the Premier Division in the 2002–03 season. Dungannon Swifts are a part of the Mid-Ulster F.A.

The Swifts hail from Dungannon, County Tyrone and plays their home matches at Stangmore Park. Club colours are royal blue with white trim (home strip) and yellow with a blue trim (away strip).

Dungannon have been known for their youth development, with many players such as Niall McGinn, Terry Devlin and Conor Bradley going onto have successful careers in the professional game.

== Club history ==
=== Club formation ===
The history of Dungannon Swifts Football Club began in 1949 with the formation of the club. The names of the founder committee members include Thomas Neill, Jimmy Sands, Maurice Graham, Alfred Burnett, Albert Kelly, George Richards, Albert Watt, Joe Meldrum Snr., Jack Fowler, John Martin and Ben Clarke.

=== The early years ===
In the 1949–50 season, the Swifts won the Mid Ulster Shield on their first attempt. The Swifts defeated Portadown Juniors 3–0 at Shamrock Park. The goalscorers were Johnson (1) and Neill (2). The remainder of the side included Blair, Carson, Pierson, Lynn, Gallery, Rice, Farrell and Henry. Seven of which were local players.

The club also entered the Irish Junior Cup, at the 2nd Round stage. However, a disjointed display; a man short for part of the game, from the newly formed side resulted in a 3–1 loss to Armagh Whites, in a match held at Beechvalley Park, Dungannon. With a first half equalizer scored by S. Stewart.

The following season, the Swifts made their entry into the Mid Ulster League. In the same season they made it through to the Alexander Cup, Foster Cup and Mid Ulster Shield where they landed runners up in each.

A league title followed in the 1951–52 season; a season in which they also finished runners-up in the Irish Junior cup – after a replay. And a league and shield double in 1955–56.

The Club also spent a number of Seasons in the Irish Junior Alliance League from the late Fifties until the league folded in the early sixties, which resulted in a return to the Mid Ulster League.

Admission into the Alliance was ratified in an I.F.A. meeting held on 26 July 1957. (It was hoped that by entering this higher grade of football; with teams being classified at Intermediate level, that it would eventually lead to entry into Irish League football.) The Swifts then began to assemble a team that would be able to compete in the Alliance League, for the forthcoming season (1957–58). A 2nd XI was formed, which entered into the Mid-Ulster League.

During the 1969–70 season the swifts won the Mid Ulster League without being defeated. The team only lost twice in total during the entire season including the Mid Ulster Shield final, when they were missing key players through injury. They also amassed a total of 158 goals for and only 29 against. The top scorer being Godfrey Clarke with 37; 12 other players had reached double figures.

=== Promotion to B Division ===
After twenty years in the Mid Ulster League, in 1972 the Swifts were promoted to the Irish League B Division where they managed a comfortable 4th spot in their first season.

=== Stangmore Park ===
1975 saw Stangmore Park become the official home of the Dungannon Swifts Football Club when they bought the land from Courtaulds Ltd and erected a temporary wooden Social Club. The stadium holds around 3,000 people.

=== Continued success ===
In the 1980–81 season the team had one of their most successful years ever and were crowned runners up in the B Division championship. The Swifts continued to show their dominance in the Bob Radcliffe Cup over the years but the 1987–88 season showed their skills in the senior Mid-Ulster Cup when they defeated Glenavon 2–1 to bring the trophy to Stangmore Park.

In August 1982, Dungannon Swifts officially unveiled their brand new club house. The purpose-built construction replaced the old wooden club house and would provide an ideal environment for club and social affairs such as bingo, dances and dinners.

=== Senior status ===
In 1997, Dungannon Swifts achieved senior status on its election to the Irish League First Division.

=== Promotion to Irish Premier League ===
The Club reached the top tier of Northern Irish Football; for the first time in their history, after being crowned champions of Division 1 in the 2002–03 season. This earned them promotion to the newly formed and extended 16 team Irish Premier League. Also manager Joe McAree was presented the First Division Manager of the Year award. The season is also notable for the 12–1 home victory against Carrick Rangers on 21 December 2002. This was the biggest post-war victory in the Irish League and the highest number of goals in the local game for over a century.

The club finished a respectable 10th position in their first season.

=== Gary Bownes ===
The 26-year-old former Ballinamallard United striker died during the 2005 close season. He had been the clubs’ top goalscorer during his debut season; with 15 goals, earning the club their highest Premier League finish. He was also the Swifts first winner of the Harp player of the month award in March 2005.

An annual pre-season Memorial Cup match between the Swifts and Ballinamallard was held up until 2015; in his memory, raising money for charity.

=== Setanta Cup ===
Dungannon Swifts qualified for the 2006 Setanta Sports Cup by finishing 4th in the Irish Premier League during the 2004/05 season. This success also earned Joe McAree the Manager of the year award. In the competition, Dungannon were drawn in a group with Cork City, Drogheda United and Portadown and failed to qualify for the semi-finals as Cork and Drogheda grabbed the top two places. Drogheda United would later win the tournament, beating Cork City in the final.

The club also qualified for the 2007 Setanta Sports Cup. However, they failed to progress to the semi-finals from their group, despite being undefeated in their home games.

Their most recent appearance was in the 2008 Setanta Sports Cup. However a disappointing campaign ended with only one draw, drawing a blank in four consecutive games, behind eventual winners Cork City, holders Drogheda United and Cliftonville.

=== Intertoto Cup ===
The club qualified for its first European games by finishing 4th in the Irish Premier League during the 2005–06 season. They played Icelandic club Knattspyrnudeild Keflavík in the first round of the 2006 UEFA Intertoto Cup. However, they lost 4–1; with the away goal scored by Swifts stalwart Johnny Montgomery, in Iceland and could not make up the deficit in the home game; drawing 0–0 at Mournview Park in Lurgan, leading to elimination at the very first stage of the tournament.

=== Irish Cup Final 2007 ===
The Club; managed at the time by Harry Fay, reached their first Irish Cup final in the 2006–07 season. They played league Champions Linfield at Windsor Park on 5 May 2007. Linfield took an early lead, before an equaliser by Rory Hamill. Linfield again took the lead through Glenn Ferguson, but the Swifts equalised shortly afterward through a Rodney McAree free kick. The game was level 2–2 at the break. No further goals were scored in the second half, taking the game into extra time. Despite Linfield dominance in extra time they failed to break the deadlock taking the Irish Cup final into penalties, for the first time. Both teams failed to score from their first two spot kicks. Linfield then converted their next three, with replies from Montgomery and McAree to make the score 3–2. The decisive kick was saved by the Linfield keeper from McAllister, to secure Linfield a successive League and Cup double.

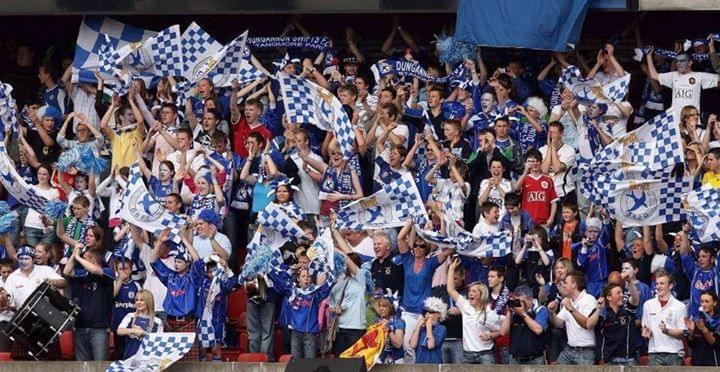

=== UEFA Cup ===
Despite their Cup final Defeat, the club qualified for the 2007–08 UEFA Cup as Irish Cup runners-up. They faced Lithuanian A Lyga runners up FK Sūduva Marijampolė in the first qualifying round. The 1st Leg was played on 19 July 2007 at Windsor Park, Belfast. A first half goal by Mark McAllister gave the Swifts a 1–0 advantage going into the away leg. The 2nd Leg was played on 2 August 2007, at the Sūduva Stadium in Lithuania. Suduva drew level on aggregate in the first half. And despite having a man sent off with the tie level, a second half hat-trick by Andrius Urbsys meant the Lithuanian side won 4–0 on the night and 4–1 on aggregate.

=== League Cup victory ===
In the 2017/18 season the club recorded its first ever senior major trophy win, defeating Ballymena United 3–1 in the final of the BetMcLean League Cup at Windsor Park, Belfast.

=== Irish Cup Final 2025 ===
The club in the 2024-25 season would win the Irish Cup for the first time ever defeating Cliftonville on penalties with goalkeeper Declan Dunne being the hero in the penalty shootout. The club would participate in the UEFA Conference League for the first time, with their cup win marking their first European appearance since 2007. The club would face FC Vaduz from Liechtenstein, earning credit for winning 1-0 away from home, however the Swifts would lose in extra time at home, narrowly missing out on a tie with Dutch giants AZ Alkmaar.

== European record ==
=== Overview ===
Competition	Matches	W	D	L	GF	GA
UEFA Cup	2	1	0	1	1	4
UEFA Intertoto Cup	2	0	1	1	1	4
UEFA Europa Conference League	2	1	0	1	1	3
TOTAL	6	2	1	3	3	9

=== Matches ===
Season	Competition	Round	Opponent	Home	Away	Aggregate
2006	UEFA Intertoto Cup	1R	(Iceland) Keflavik	0–0	1–4	1–4
2007–08	UEFA Cup	1QR	(Lithuania) Sūduva	1–0	0–4	1–4
2025–26	UEFA Conference League	2QR	(Liechtenstein) Vaduz	0–3 (AET)	1–0	1-3

== Current squad ==
Note: Flags indicate national team as defined under FIFA eligibility rules; some limited exceptions apply. Players may hold more than one non-FIFA nationality.

No.	Pos.	Nation	Player
1	GK	NIR	Declan Dunne
2	DF	NIR	Steven Scott
3	DF	NIR	John Scott
4	DF	IRL	Peter Maguire
5	DF	NIR	Barney McKeown
6	MF	NIR	Tiernan Kelly
7	FW	NIR	Darragh McBrien
9	FW	NIR	Andrew Mitchell
10	FW	IRL	Kealan Dillon
12	GK	NIR	Alex Henderson
13	MF	GBS	Leo Alves
14	DF	NIR	Adam Glenny
15	MF	NIR	Kris Lowe
16	MF	NIR	Shea Gordon

No.	Pos.	Nation	Player
17	DF	NIR	Cahal McGinty
21	MF	IRL	Paul Doyle
22	MF	NIR	Bobby-Jack McAleese
23	DF	NIR	Danny Wallace
27	FW	NIR	Sam Anderson
31	GK	NIR	Dylan Glass
34	MF	BDI	Gaël Bigirimana
37	FW	NIR	Corey Smith
39	FW	NIR	Aidan Hegarty
67	MF	NIR	Sean McAllister
TBA	MF	NIR	Jamie Glackin
TBA	MF	NIR	Michael McElhatton
TBA	FW	ENG	Junior Ogedi-Uzokwe

== Non-playing staff ==
Current role	Name
President	David Flack
Chairman	Keith Boyd

- Manager: Rodney McAree
- Assistant Manager: Dixie Robinson
- First team coach: Terry Fitzpatrick
- Goalkeeping Player-Coach: Alan Cooke

== Notable former players ==
- Joe Meldrum – 27 League Goals for Distillery: 1962–63 Season / Featured in European Cup tie v. Benfica
- Derek Meldrum – Featured in European Cup tie v. Benfica for Distillery
- Dick Matchett – 40 Goals: 1975–76 Season
- George Scott – Former Club Captain
- Ronnie Anderson Former Club Captain
- Ronnie Clarke – 35 Goals: 1984–85 Season
- Bertie McMinn – 42 Goals: 1991–92 Season
- Mark Hughes – Senior Northern Ireland International
- (Northern Ireland) Mark McAllister – 2006/07 Ulster Young Footballer of the Year
- Niall McGinn – Senior Northern Ireland International
- (Northern Ireland) Mark Savage – Former Club Captain
- Sean Webb – Senior Northern Ireland International
- Rory Hamill – Former Northern Ireland international
- (Northern Ireland) David Scullion – Included in 2005–06 and 2006–07 NIFWA Irish League Team of the Year / U21 International
- Rodney McAree – Ex. Liverpool Trainee & Fulham / Northern Ireland schoolboy international
- Luke McCullough – Senior Northern Ireland International
- Andrew Mitchell – 2016/17 Danske Bank Premiership Top Scorer (25 Goals)
- Conor Bradley — Liverpool F.C.

== Managerial history ==
- Ben Clarke (Coach)
- Henry Shepherd
- Dick Matchett (Caretaker During 1976–77 Season)
- Godfrey Clarke (1977–78 Season)
- Peter Watson (Player-Manager)
- Eric Magee
- Armstrong Beckett
- Colin Malone (1996–2000)
- Colin Jeffers & Terry McCrory (2000–2001)
- (Northern Ireland) Joe McAree (Multiple Spells > 1996, 2001–06)
- (Northern Ireland) Harry Fay (2006–2008)
- (Northern Ireland) John Cunningham (2008–09)
- (Northern Ireland) Dixie Robinson (2009–2011)
- (Northern Ireland) Rodney McAree (15 Dec 2011 – Feb 2012, Aug 2012 – Oct 2012*) *Joint Role
- (Northern Ireland) Darren Murphy (Feb 2012 – October 2015)
- (Northern Ireland) Rodney McAree (Oct 2015 – September 2018)
- (Northern Ireland) Kris Lindsay (Sept 2018 – February 2021)
- (Northern Ireland) Dean Shiels (March 2021–June 2023)

== Honours ==
=== Senior honours ===
- Irish Cup: 1
  - 2024–25
- Irish Cup runners-up: 1
  - 2025–26 (lost 2–3 to Coleraine)
- Northern Ireland Football League Cup: 1
  - 2017–18
- NIFL Charity Shield: 1
  - 2025
- Ulster Cup: 1
  - 2002–03
- Irish League First Division: 1
  - 2002–03
- Mid-Ulster Cup: 11
  - 1970–71, 1975–76, 1987–88, 1996–97, 2005–06, 2008–09, 2012–13, 2013–14, 2014–15, 2015–16, 2024–25

=== Intermediate honours ===
- Irish League 'B' Division South Section: 1
  - 1975–76
- IFA Reserve League: 1
  - 2005–06†
- Irish Intermediate Cup: 2
  - 1977–78, 1991–92
- B Division Knockout Cup: 1
  - 1993–94
- George Wilson Cup: 3
  - 1973–74, 2003–04†, 2005–06†
- Louis Moore Cup: 1
  - 1975–76
- Bob Radcliffe Cup: 9
  - 1981–82, 1985–86, 1986–87, 1989–90, 1992–93, 1993–94, 1994–95, 1995–96, 2005–06†
- Ivan Marshall Memorial Cup: 1
  - 2016–17
- † Won by reserve team

=== Junior honours ===
- Mid-Ulster Shield: 4
  - 1949–50†, 1955–56†, 1970–71†, 1993–94†
- Mid-Ulster League: 5
  - 1951–52†, 1955–56†, 1969–70, 1970–71†, 1975–76†
- Alexander Cup: 4
  - 1967–68†, 1969–70†, 1970–71†, 1976–77†
- Mid-Ulster Youth Cup: 2
  - 2013–14‡, 2016–17‡
- † Won by reserve team
- ‡ Won by youth team
