= Cummings and Sears =

American architecture firm

Cummings & Sears

Practice information
- Founders: Charles Amos Cummings, Willard T. Sears
- Founded: 1864
- Dissolved: 1889
- Location: Boston, Massachusetts

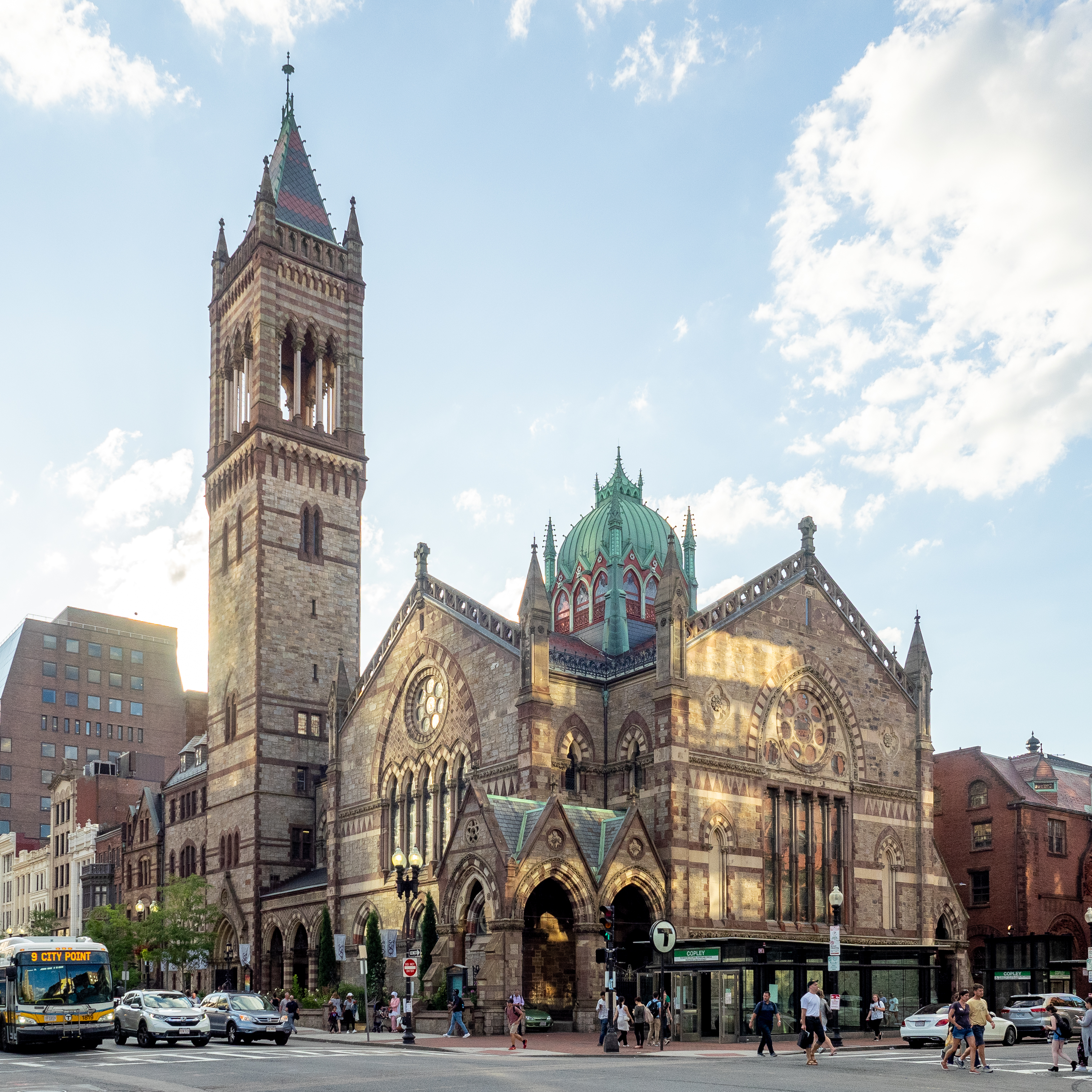
The Old South Church in Boston, Massachusetts, completed in 1875.

Cummings and Sears (est. 1864) was an architecture firm in 19th-century Boston, Massachusetts, established by Charles Amos Cummings and Willard T. Sears.

== History and legacy ==
In the 1860s they kept an office in the Studio Building on Tremont Street, moving in the 1870s to Pemberton Square.

Although most of their works are concentrated in New England, they also were commissioned to design buildings as far west as Utah as well as on Campobello Island in New Brunswick, Canada. Their best known work is Old South Church in Boston, completed in 1875.

Architects who worked in the office of Cummings & Sears include Charles L. Bevins of Rhode Island and Warren R. Briggs and Edward A. Cudworth of Connecticut.

Several of their buildings have been listed on the United States National Register of Historic Places, and others contribute to listed historic districts.

== Architectural works ==
- Academy Hall, Phillips Academy, Andover, Massachusetts (1865, demolished)
- Brechin Hall, Andover Theological Seminary, Andover, Massachusetts (1866, demolished)
- Sears Building, Boston, Massachusetts (1868-69, demolished 1967)
- Capen School (former), South Boston, Boston, Massachusetts (1870-71)
- Mason & Hamlin Store, Boston, Massachusetts (1870, demolished)
- Hotel Boylston, Boston, Massachusetts (1871, demolished 1897)
- Carriage house at "Peacefield," Quincy, Massachusetts (1872)
- House for Charles Amos Cummings, Boston, Massachusetts (1872)
- House for Willard T. Sears, Boston, Massachusetts (1872)
- New England Hospital for Women and Children, Roxbury, Boston, Massachusetts (1872, NRHP 1985)
- Congregational House, Boston, Massachusetts (1873, demolished)
- First Universalist Church, Lynn, Massachusetts (1873, demolished)
- Old South Church, Boston, Massachusetts (1873-75, NRHP 1970)
- Bedford Block, Boston, Massachusetts (1874-75, NRHP 1979)
- Macullar, Parker & Company Store, Boston, Massachusetts (1874, demolished)
- Montgomery Building, Boston, Massachusetts (1874, demolished)
- Yale University Boathouse, New Haven, Connecticut (1874-75, demolished 1910)
- Stone Chapel, Andover Theological Seminary, Andover, Massachusetts (1875-76, demolished)
- Grand Opera House, New Bedford, Massachusetts (1881-82, demolished)
- House for Charles James Sprague, Boston, Massachusetts (1881)
- Tyn-Y-Coed and Tyn-Y-Maes Hotels, Campobello Island, New Brunswick, Canada (1882-83, demolished)
- Cyclorama Building, Boston, Massachusetts (1884, altered 1923, NRHP 1973)
- Union Chapel (former), Magnolia, Massachusetts (1884)
- House for James H. Frothingham, (Note: A contributing property to the Dublin Village Historic District, NRHP-listed in 1983.) Dublin, New Hampshire (1885)
- "Ullikana" for Alpheus Hardy, Bar Harbor, Maine (1885)
- Magnolia Library, Magnolia, Massachusetts (1887)
- Peoples Trust Company Building, (Note: A contributing property to the Farmington Historic District, NRHP-listed in 1995.) Farmington, Maine (1887)
- Proctor Academy, Provo, Utah (1887, demolished)

== Gallery of architectural works ==
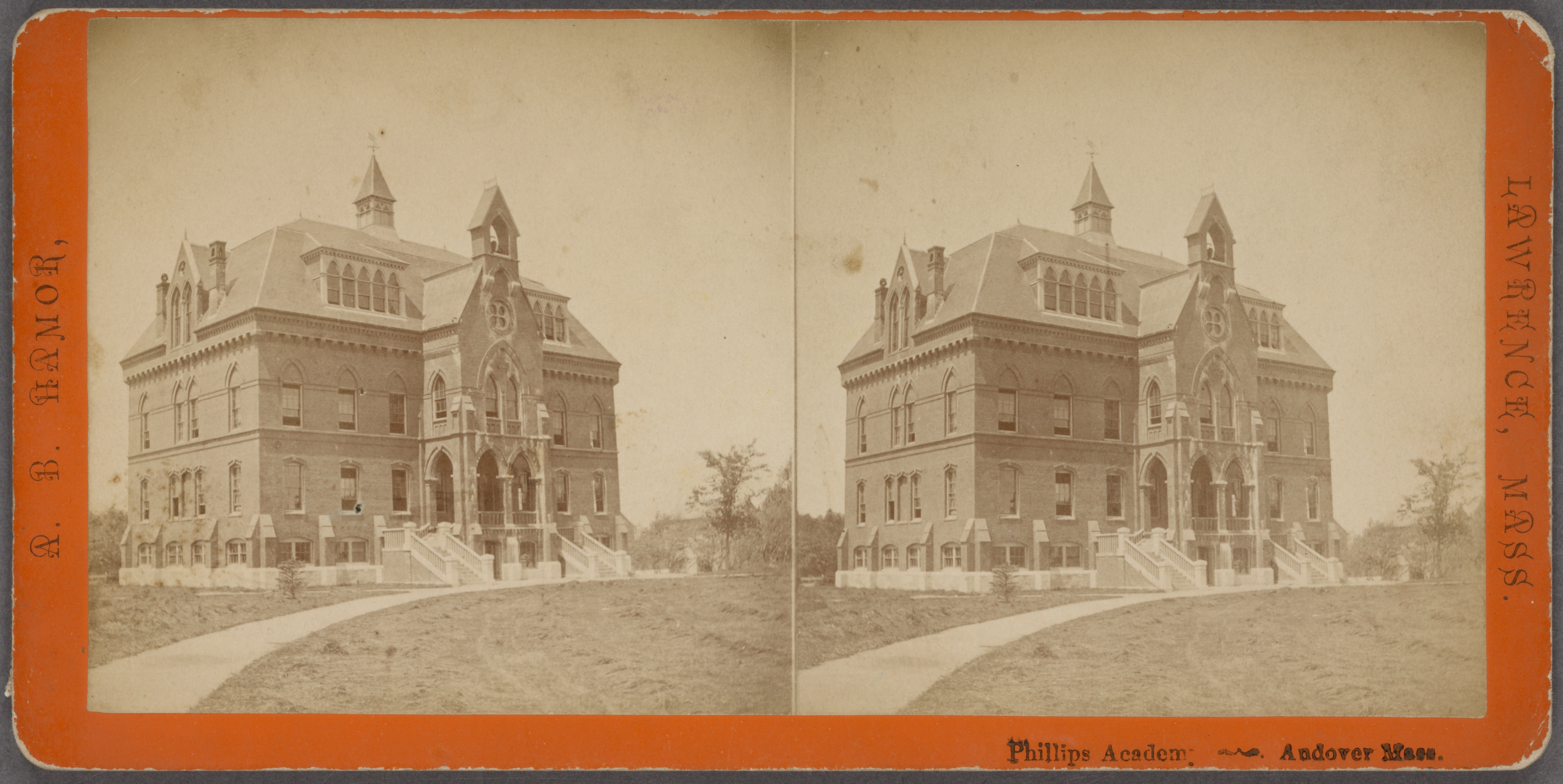
Academy Hall, Phillips Academy, Andover, Massachusetts, 1865.

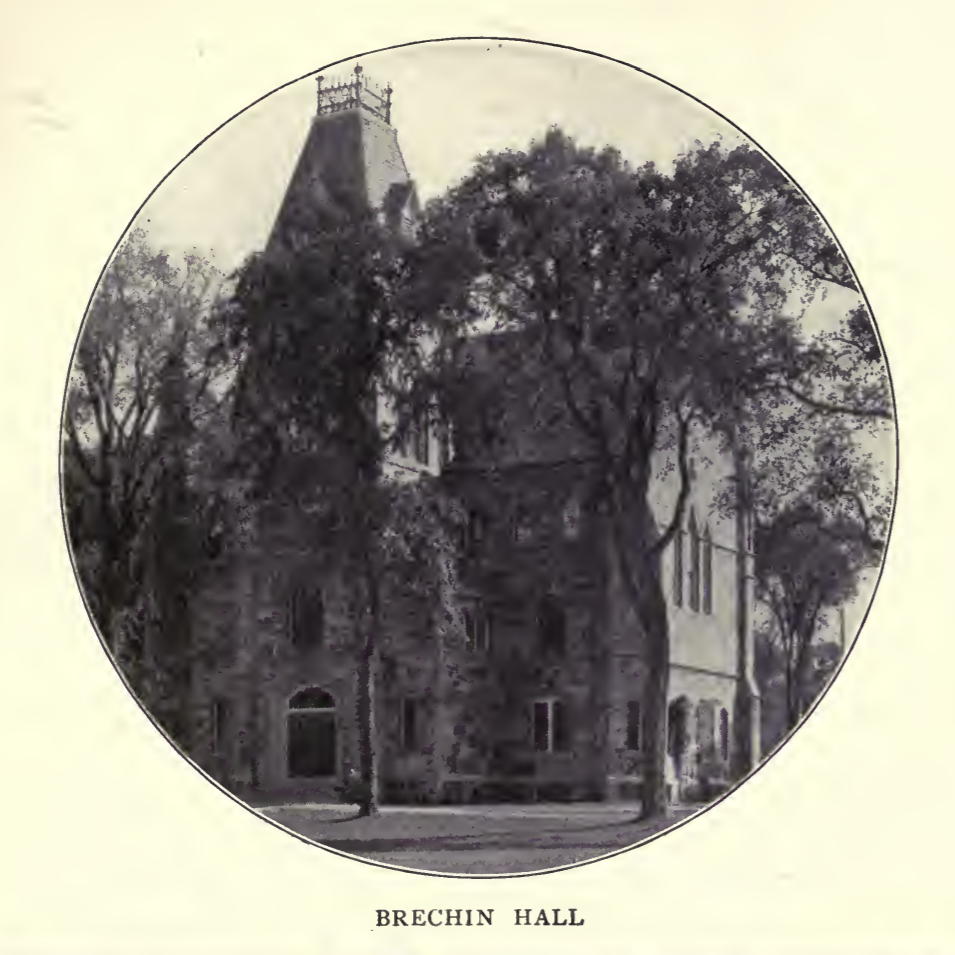
Brechin Hall, Andover Theological Seminary, Andover, Massachusetts, 1866.

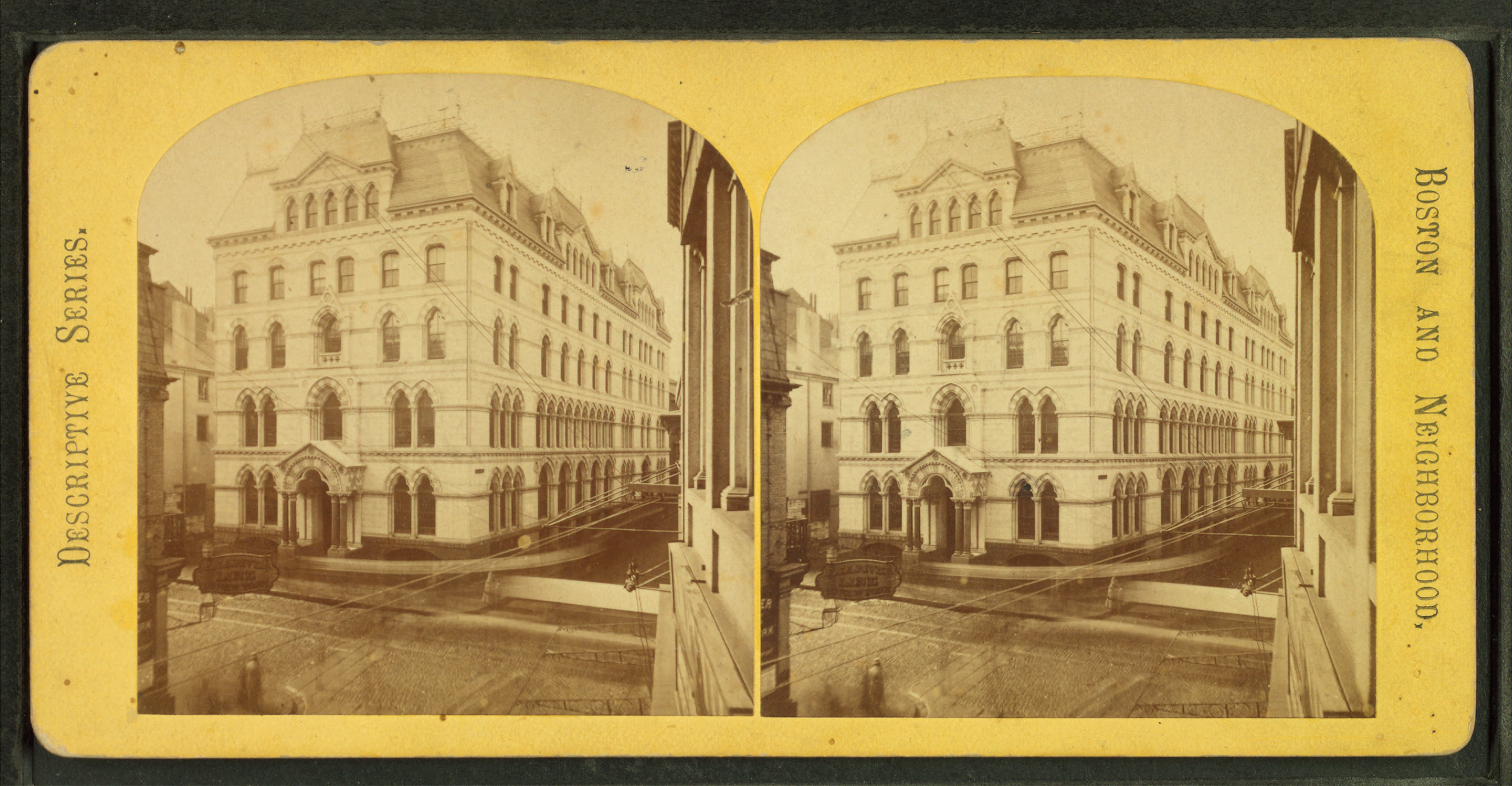
Sears Building, Boston, Massachusetts, 1868-69.

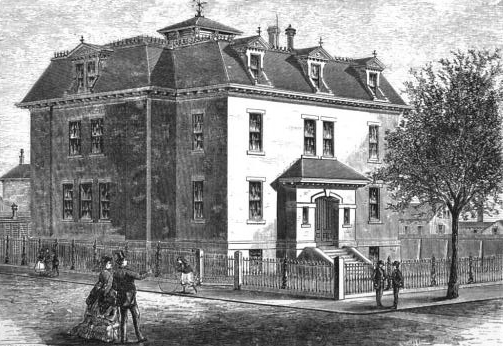
Capen School, South Boston, Boston, Massachusetts, 1870-71.

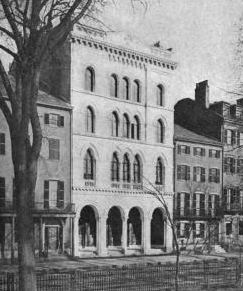
Mason & Hamlin Store, Boston, Massachusetts, 1870.

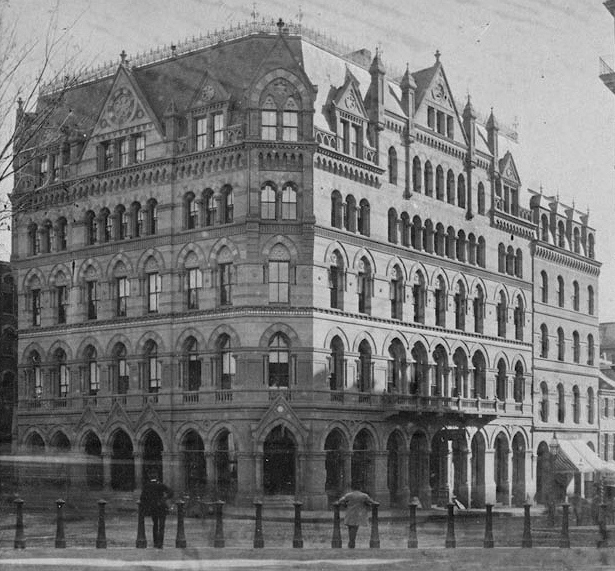
Hotel Boylston, Boston, Massachusetts, 1871.

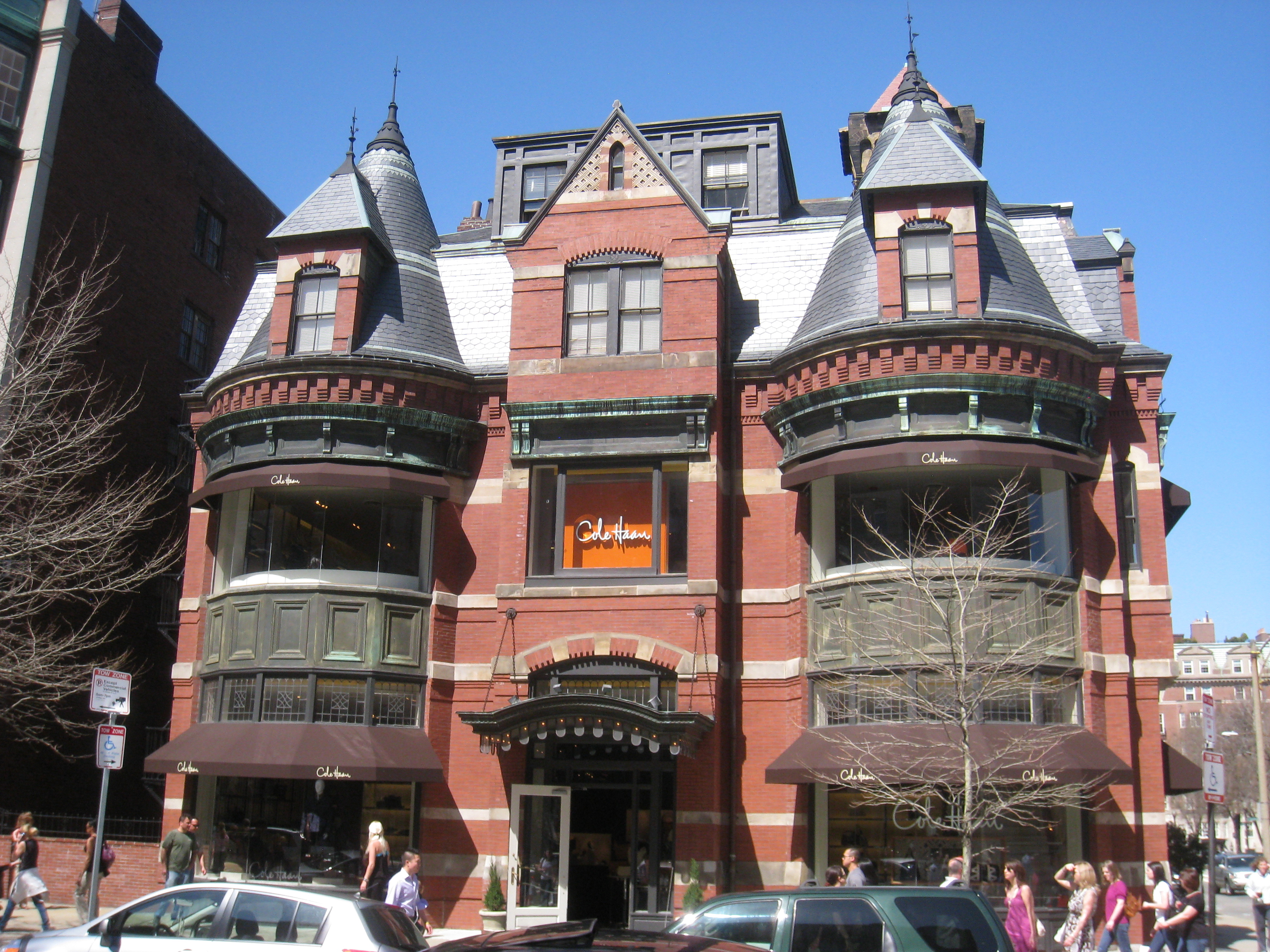
House for Charles Amos Cummings, Boston, Massachusetts, 1872.

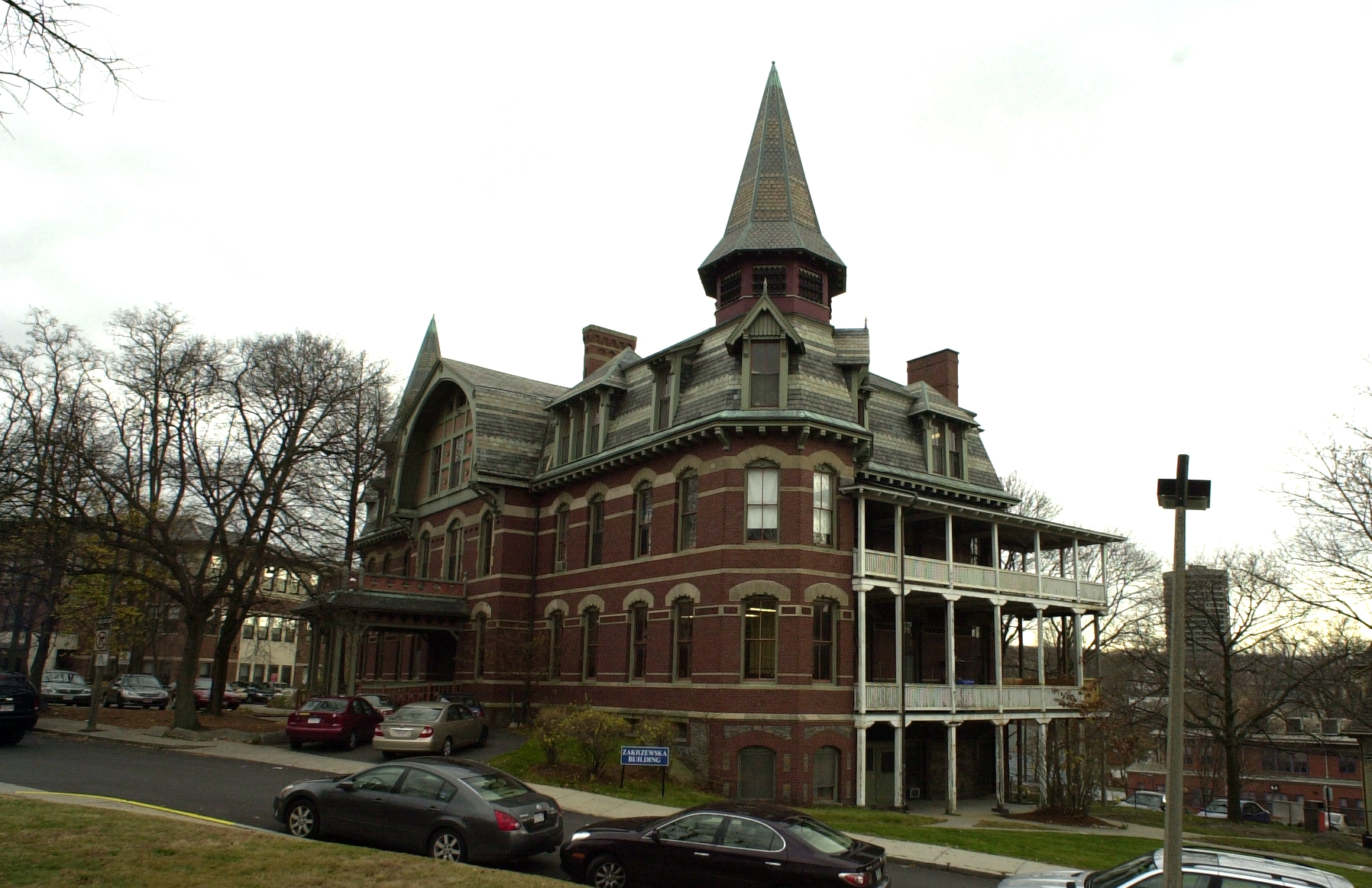
New England Hospital for Women and Children, Roxbury, Boston, Massachusetts, 1872.

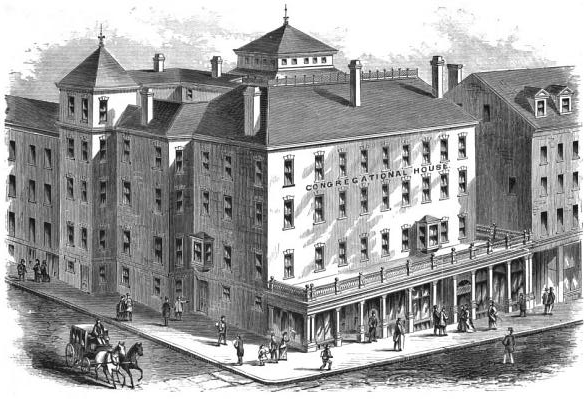
Congregational House, Boston, Massachusetts, 1873.

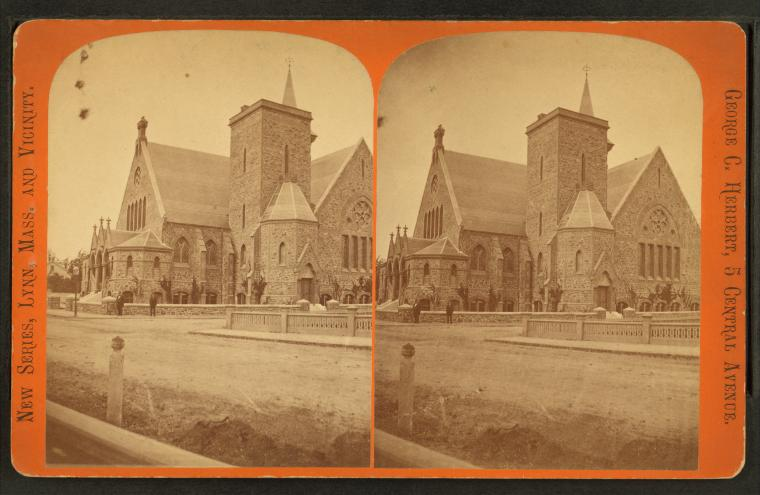
First Universalist Church, Lynn, Massachusetts, 1873.

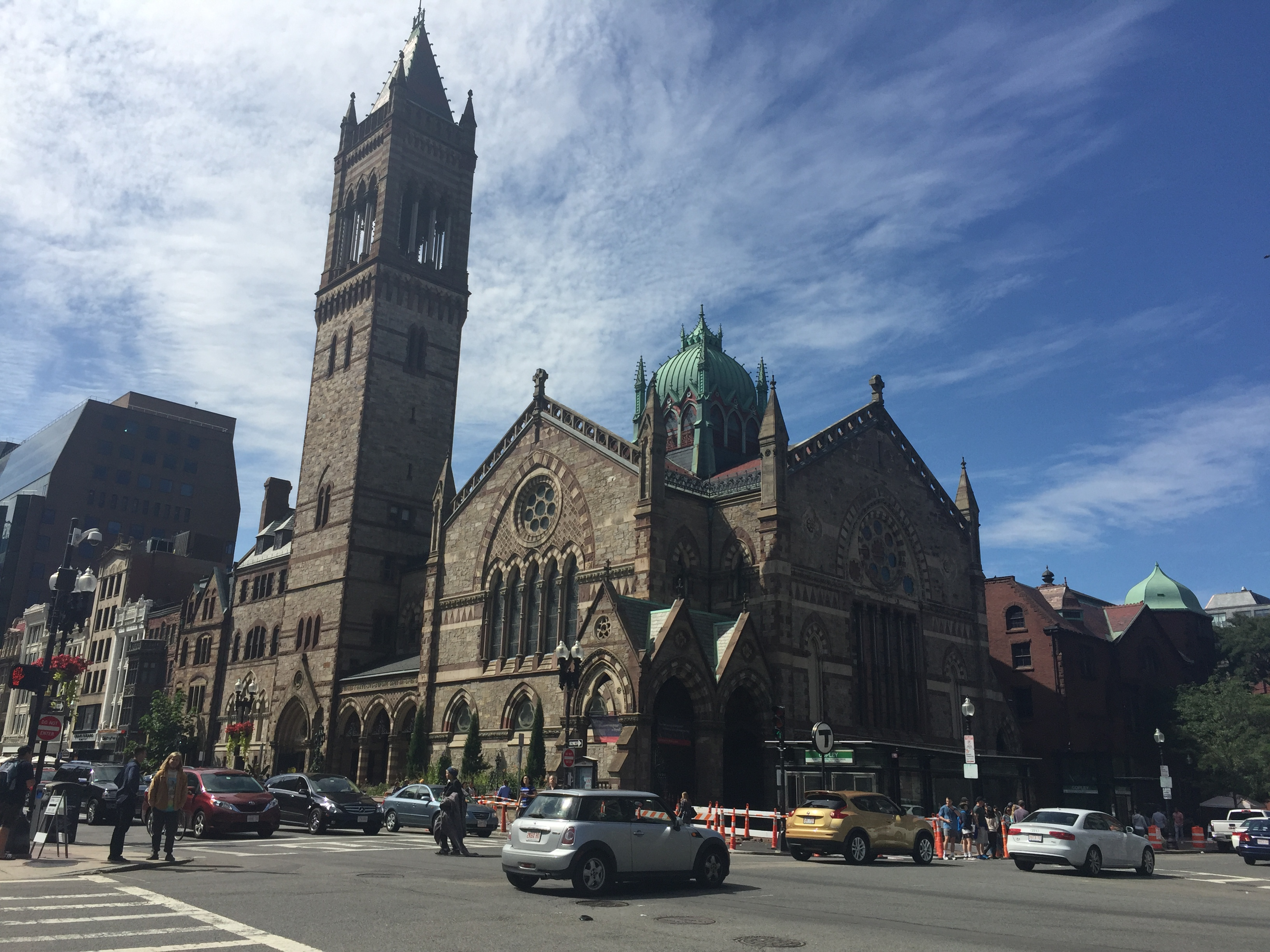
Old South Church, Boston, Massachusetts, 1873-75.

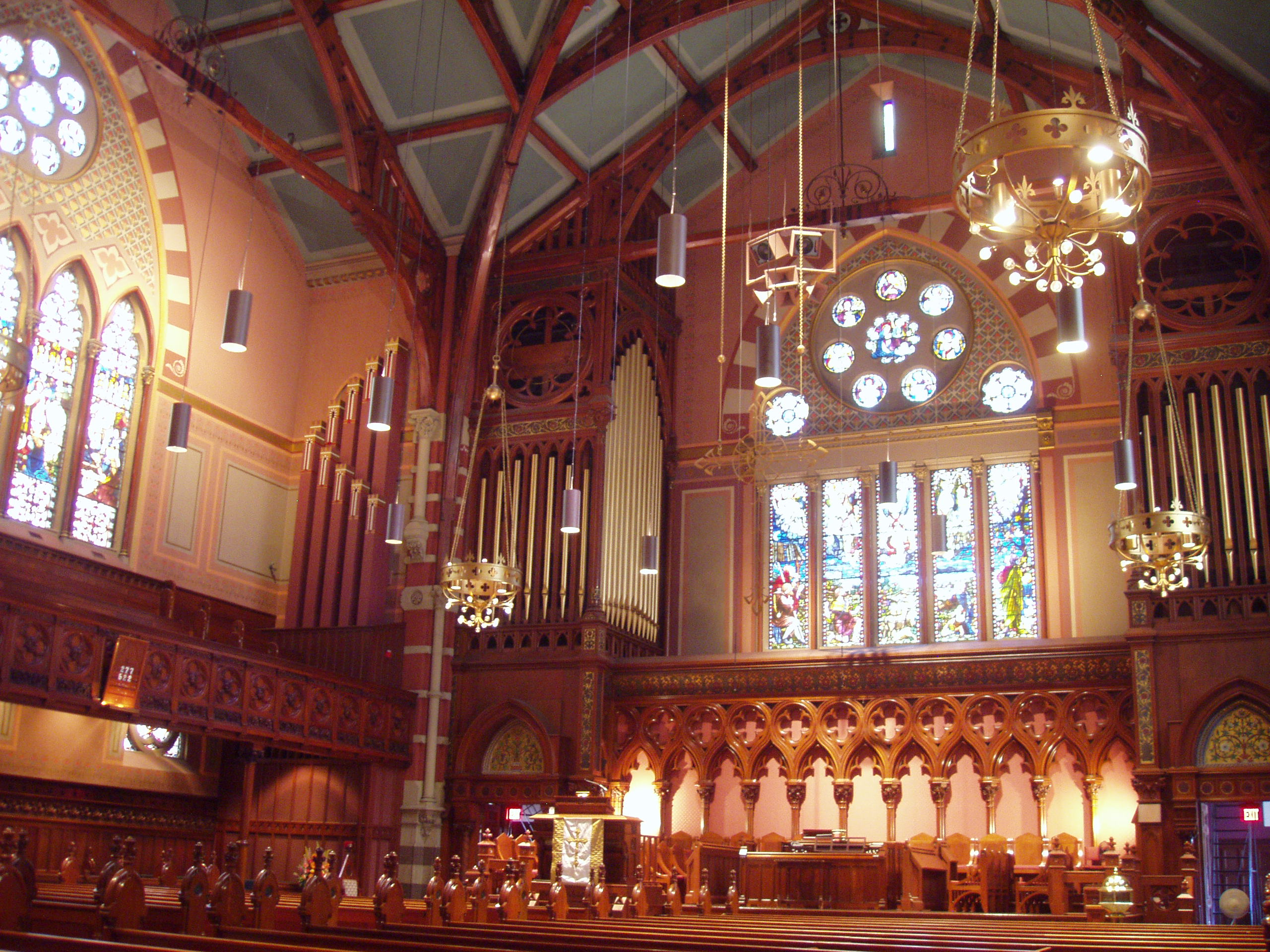
Interior of the Old South Church, Boston, Massachusetts, 1873-75.

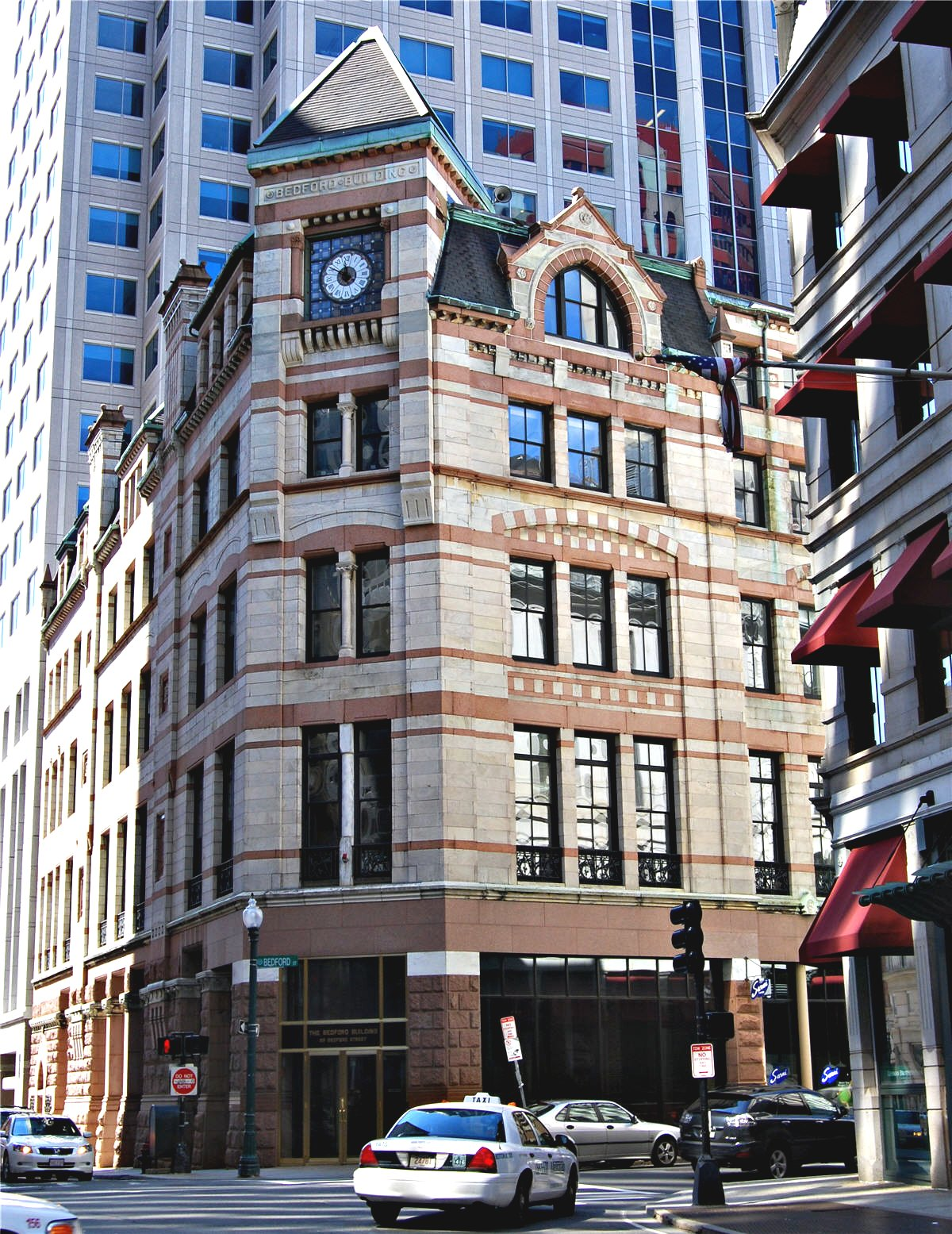
Bedford Block, Boston, Massachusetts, 1874-75.

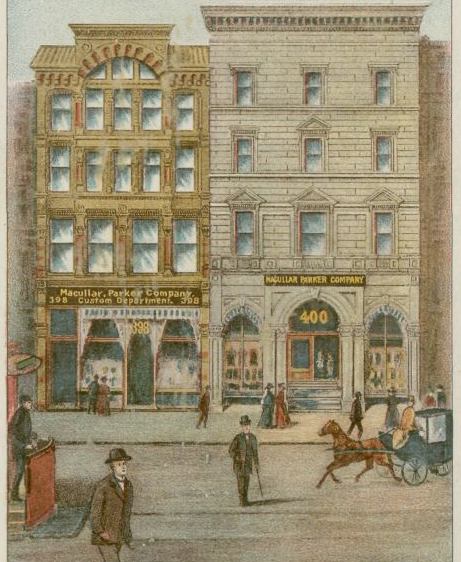
Macullar, Parker & Company Store, Boston, Massachusetts, 1874.

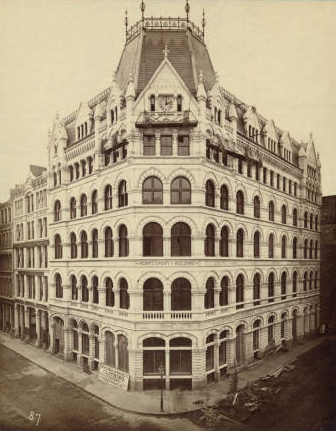
Montgomery Building, Boston, Massachusetts, 1874.

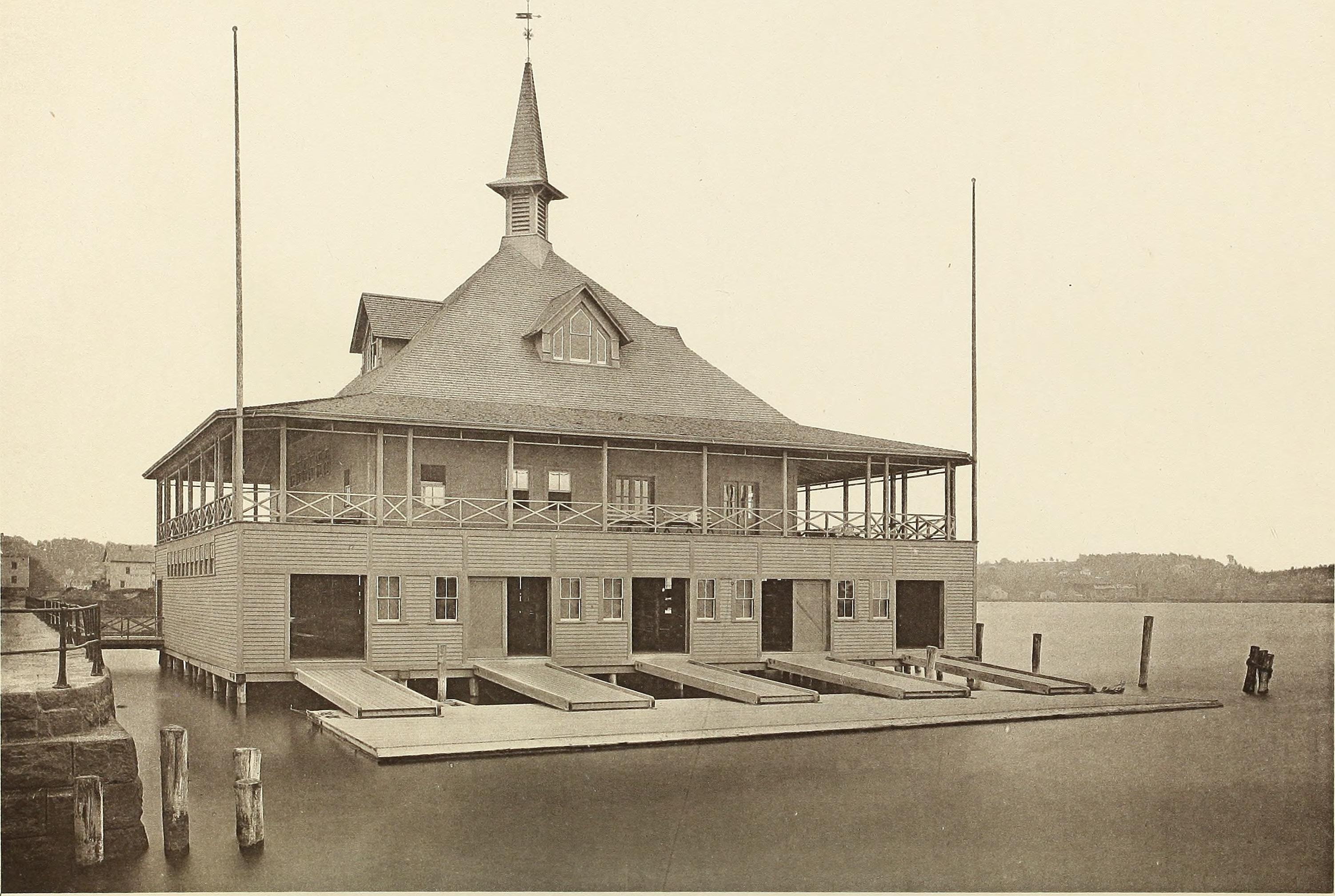
Yale University Boathouse, New Haven, Connecticut, 1874-75.

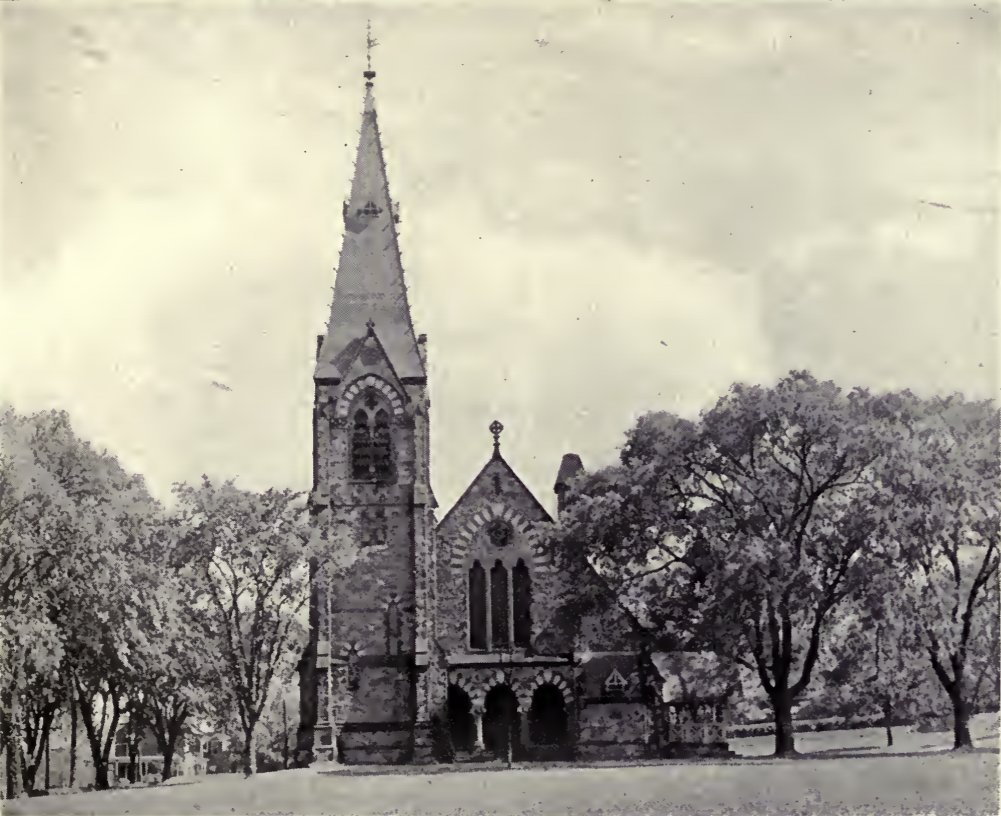
Stone Chapel, Andover Theological Seminary, Andover, Massachusetts, 1875-76.

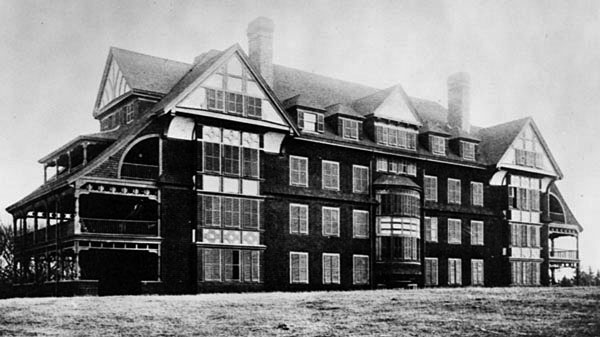
Tyn-Y-Coed Hotel Campobello Island, New Brunswick, Canada, 1882.

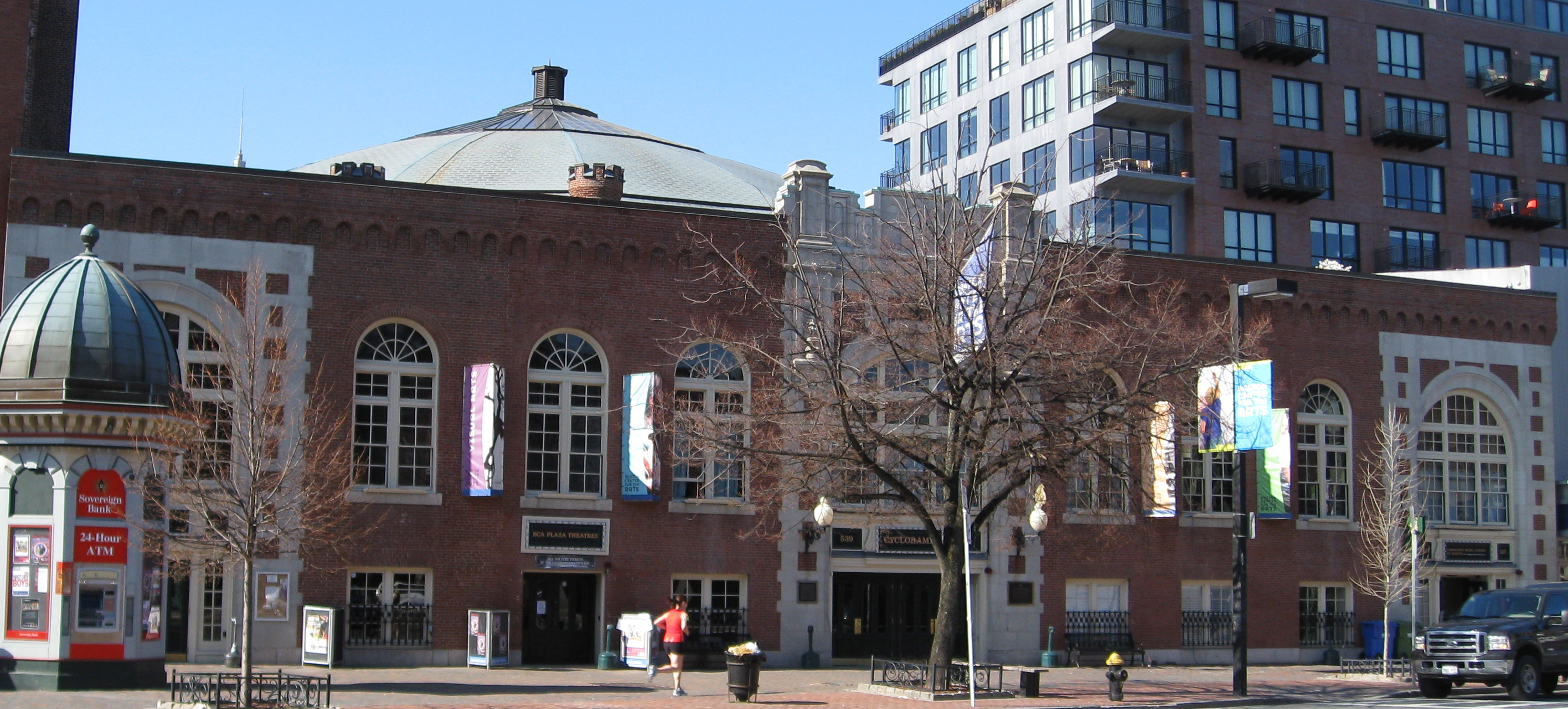
Cyclorama Building, Boston, Massachusetts, 1884.

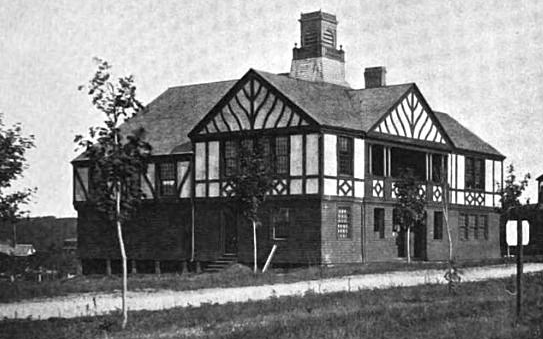
Magnolia Library, Magnolia, Massachusetts, 1887.

== See also ==
- Albert Levy (photographer)
