= Boston Center for the Arts =

Coordinates: 42.3447°N 71.0714°W

The Boston Center for the Arts (BCA) is a 501(c) nonprofit visual and performing arts complex in the South End neighborhood of Boston, Massachusetts. The BCA houses several performance and rehearsal spaces, restaurants, a gallery, the headquarters of the Boston Ballet, the Community Music Center of Boston and several other arts organizations. The BCA also serves as home to four Resident Theater Companies and a number of artists. The BCA's main building, the Cyclorama, is on the National Register of Historic Places. Boston Ballet's headquarters was designed in 1991 by architect Graham Gund.

== History ==
The BCA began operation in 1970 when the Boston Redevelopment Authority, in an effort to revitalize the South End area, designated one city block for the development of a new arts center. The city of Boston purchased the old Cyclorama Building and neighboring brownstone buildings for the project and agreed to lease the property to the newly formed BCA for a nominal yearly fee. The BCA is fully responsible for the management of its historic campus. The Cyclorama, a large rotunda, was built in 1884 by Charles Amos Cummings and Willard T. Sears to house the Battle of Gettysburg, a panoramic painting by the French artist Paul Philippoteaux.

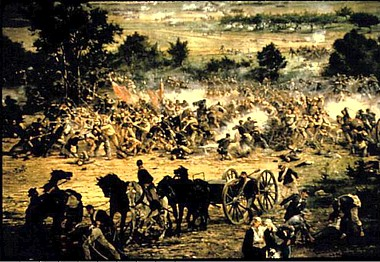
Battle of Gettysburg

The building’s original façade included a number of turrets and towers, and a stately arch at the entrance, giving it the appropriate appearance of a fortress.

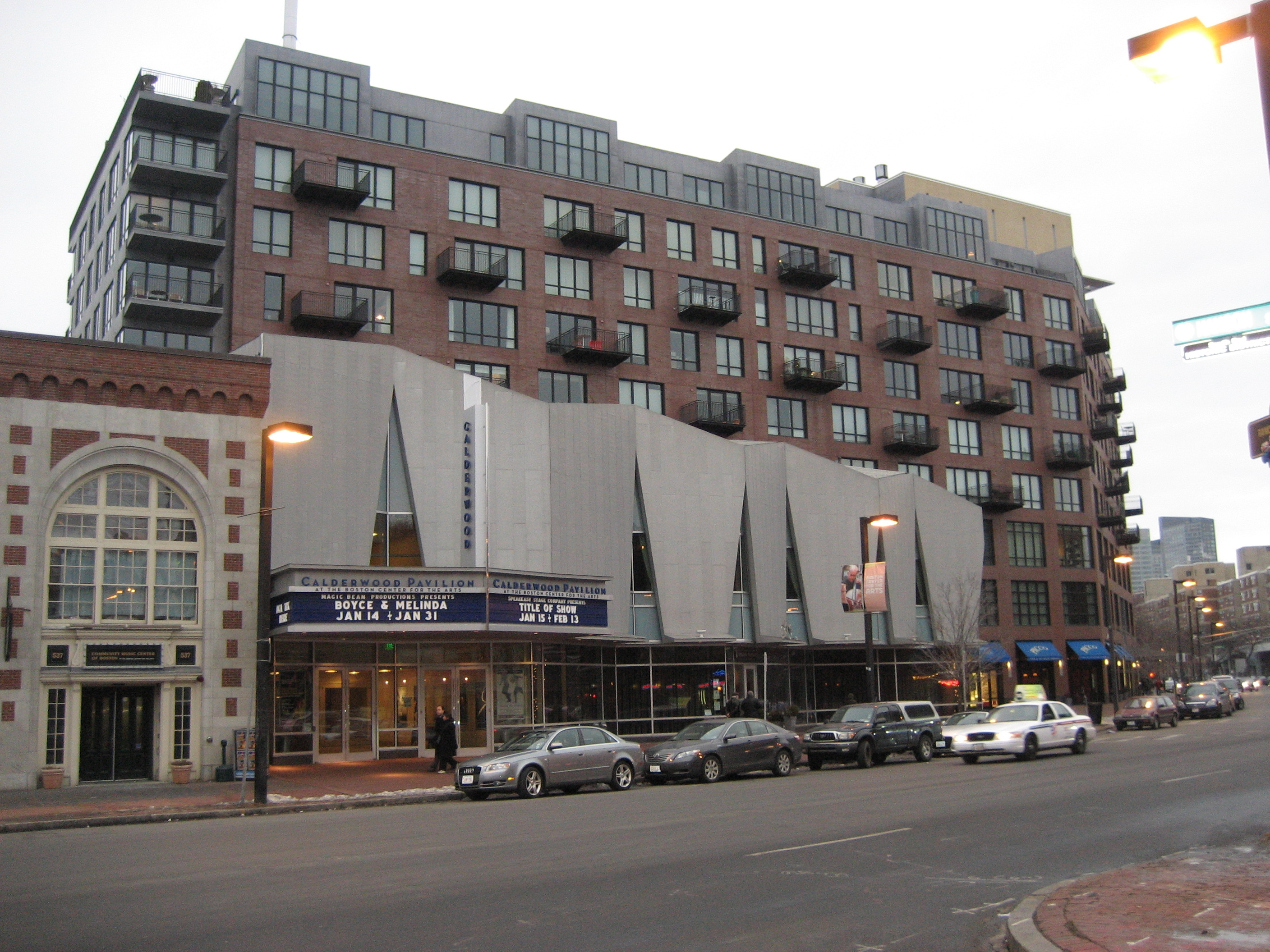
The Calderwood Pavilion

Between 1899 and 1922, the Cyclorama building had many uses, including incarnations as a garage, a boxing ring, and an automobile workshop. The Boston Flower Exchange purchased the Cyclorama building in 1922 to use the space as its headquarters and venue for its flower shows. During the Flower Exchange’s tenure, the façade was renovated, the turrets removed and the arch demolished. The copper dome that sat atop the Cyclorama was replaced by a glass skylight. In 1967, the Boston Redevelopment Authority, spurred by Royal Cloyd, a South End resident and chairman of the Urban Renewal Committee, began planning the development of a new center for the arts in Boston. Cloyd, the founder and eventual first president of the BCA, realized the need for affordable space for artists to work during a visit to the Atlanta Arts Center. Under Cloyd's advice, the BRA designated the Cyclorama building, the National Theatre, the Pennock and Tremont Estates buildings as the site of the new arts center. The BCA has grown exponentially since its birth, becoming one of Boston’s premiere arts organizations and venues. In 2004, the BCA entered into a partnership with the Huntington Theatre Company, building the Stanford Calderwood Pavilion, the first new theater venue built in Boston in over 75 years. The Calderwood Pavilion stands on the site of the old National Theater, a vaudeville theater that attracted the likes of Sammy Davis Jr. and Duke Ellington.

In early October 2019, the organization’s board of directors announced that CEO Gregory Ruffer resigned following allegations of inappropriate conduct while he worked as a professor at College of Central Florida during the 2009-2010 academic year.

== Facilities ==
- The Cyclorama Building, the original building of the BCA’s complex, is now used as the main source of revenue for the Boston Center for the Arts. The Cyclorama is available on a rental basis for public and private events. It houses everything from fundraisers, trade shows and corporate events to exhibitions, performances, and weddings. Notable past installations include Judy Chicago’s The Dinner Party (1980) and Sarah Caldwell’s Louise. The bottom floor of the Cyclorama is home to C.P Casting, a major Boston casting firm, and the Community Music Center of Boston, which offers lessons to over 5,000 individuals each year.
- Built in 2004, the Stanford Calderwood Pavilion is a 36,000 SF complex containing the 372-seat Virginia Wimberly Theatre and the 200-seat Nancy and Edward Roberts Theatre, along with rehearsal rooms, a box office, public lobbies and back of house area. The Huntington uses the Wimberly Theatre as its secondary performance space. SpeakEasy Stage Company mounts its entire season in the Roberts Studio Theatre.
- The Plaza Theaters serve as performance spaces for the Resident Theater Companies, which currently include: CHUANG Stage, Fresh Ink Theatre. Available for rentals and performances are the Plaza Theater, a fixed-seat theater that holds about 150, and the Black Box Theater, a flexible performance space with a capacity of about 50.
- The Artist Studios are affordable workspaces for over 50 artists and arts organizations. They currently include The SpeakEasy Stage Company, Company One, and The Theater Offensive, and South End Strings.
- The Mills Gallery is a 2,200-square-foot (200 m^{2}) noncommercial gallery with three separate spaces. It accommodates 3 major exhibitions each year, as well as a number of small exhibitions and events, showcasing the work of established and emerging visual artists from all over the world.
