= Cyclorama Building (Boston) =

1884 building in the South End of Boston, Massachusetts, United States

- U.S. National Register of Historic Places
- U.S. Historic district – Contributing property
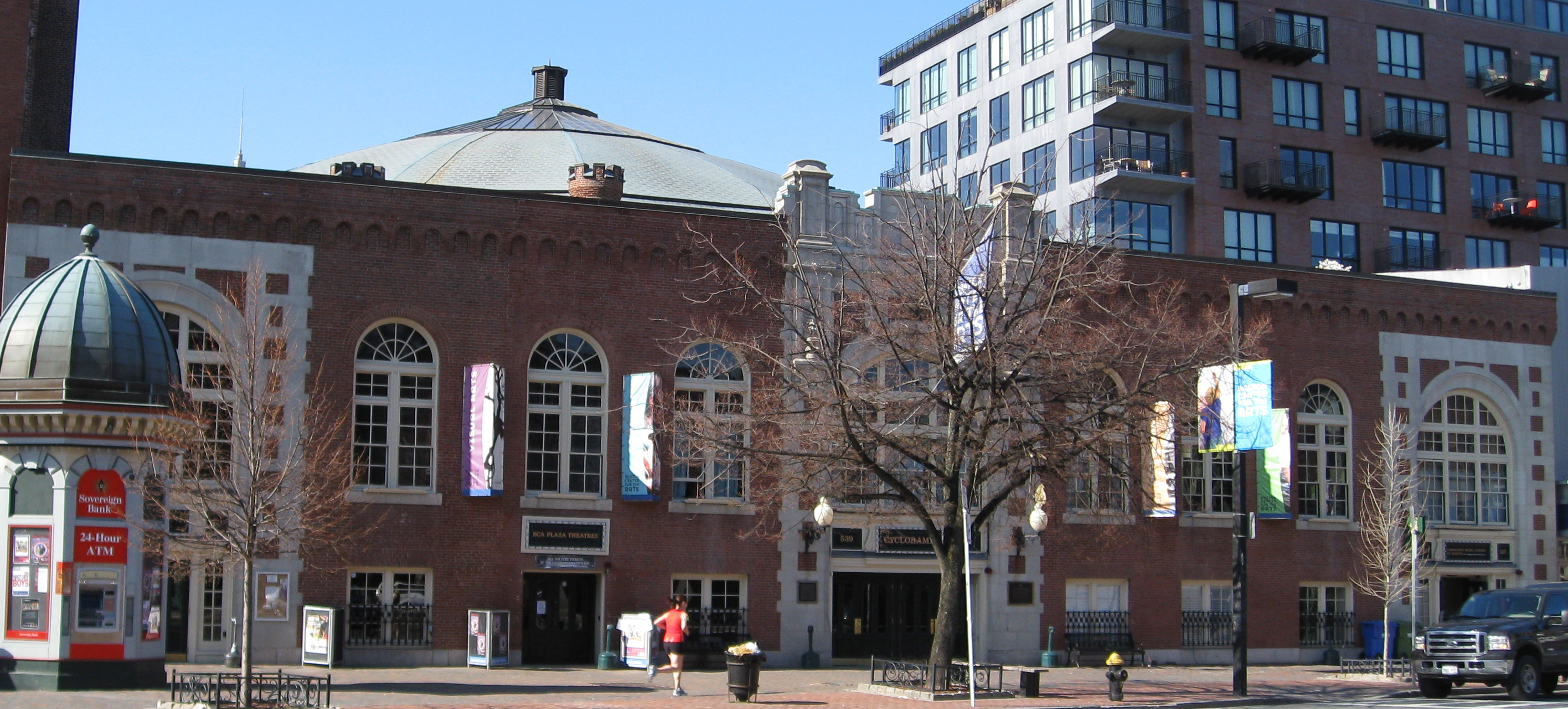

- Location within Massachusetts Location within the United States
- Location: 543-547 Tremont Street, Boston, Massachusetts
- Coordinates: 42°20′40″N 71°4′19″W
- Built: 1884
- Architect: Cummings and Sears
- Architectural style: Classical Revival, Late Victorian
- Part of: South End District (ID73000324)
- NRHP reference No.: 73000318

Significant dates
- Added to NRHP: April 13, 1973
- Designated CP: May 8, 1973

The Cyclorama Building is an 1884 building in the South End of Boston, Massachusetts that is operated by the Boston Center for the Arts.

== History ==
The Classical Revival style Victorian building was commissioned by Charles F. Willoughby's Boston Cyclorama Company to house the Cyclorama of the Battle of Gettysburg, a 400-by-50 foot cyclorama painting of the Battle of Gettysburg. It was designed by Charles Amos Cummings and Willard T. Sears. The central space is a 127'-diameter steel-trussed dome which, when it was built, was the largest dome in the country after that on the United States Capitol building. Visitors entered through the crenelated archway, proceeded along a dark winding passage, and then ascended a winding staircase to an elevated viewing platform. Skylights lit the scene by day, and it was illuminated by a system of 25 arc lamps by night.

In 1889, a new cyclorama painting, Custer's Last Fight, was installed, but by 1890, the fashion for cycloramas had ended, and the new owner of the building, John Gardner (father-in-law of Isabella Stewart Gardner), converted it to a venue for popular entertainment, including a carousel, roller skating, boxing tournaments (including an 1894 fight of John L. Sullivan), horseback riding, bicycling, and so on.

By the 1890s, it had become an industrial space, used by the Albert Champion Company. In 1907, Albert Champion developed the Champion spark plug there.

When the Boston Flower Exchange bought the building in 1923, it added a new entrance and covered central dome with a skylight. The Flower Exchange occupied the building until 1970.

The Cyclorama was added to the National Register of Historic Places in 1973.

== Bunker Hill Cyclorama ==
Another, competing cyclorama building was built two blocks from the first, and displayed a cyclorama of The Battle of Bunker Hill.

The competing Battle of Bunker Hill Cyclorama, 1889

== See also ==
- National Register of Historic Places listings in southern Boston, Massachusetts
