= George Washington Blagden =

American clergyman

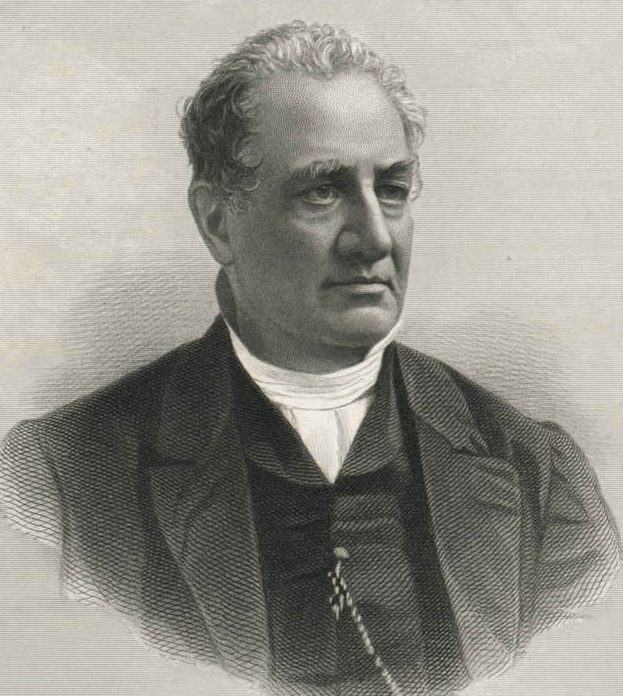
- Born: October 3, 1802; Washington, D.C.
- Died: December 17, 1884 (aged 82); New York City

George Washington Blagden (October 3, 1802 – December 17, 1884) was an American clergyman.

== Early life and education ==
Blagden was born in Washington, D.C., October 3, 1802; his father was originally from Yorkshire, England.

He entered Yale College in 1820 and graduated in 1823.

== Career ==
After graduation, he took the three years' course at the Andover Theological Seminary. On December 26, 1827, he was ordained the first pastor of the Congregational Church in Brighton, Mass., then just organized as a result of the prevailing Unitarian controversy. He left this parish to accept a call to the Salem Street (Congregational) Church in Boston, where he was installed, November 3, 1830; and he was dismissed on September 5, 1836, from this engagement, to be installed on the 28th of the same month over the Old South Church, in the same city. He was also a member of the Massachusetts Constitutional Convention in 1853, and from 1854 to 1859 was one of the Board of Overseers of Harvard University. He had received a doctorate in divinity from Harvard in 1850, as well as one from Union College in 1849. A colleague pastor was settled in 1857. In 1872, he resigned his charge, continuing, however, to be connected with the church as pastor emeritus until his death.

== Personal life ==
He married, June 8, 1831, Miriam, younger daughter of the Hon. John Phillips of Boston, who died April 26, 1874. Their children were five sons and three daughters, of whom four sons and a daughter survived him.

In 1883, he removed to New York City, to spend his remaining days in the home of a married daughter, and there he died very suddenly, of heart-disease, December 17, 1884, in his 83rd year.
