= Charles Amos Cummings =

American architect and architectural historian

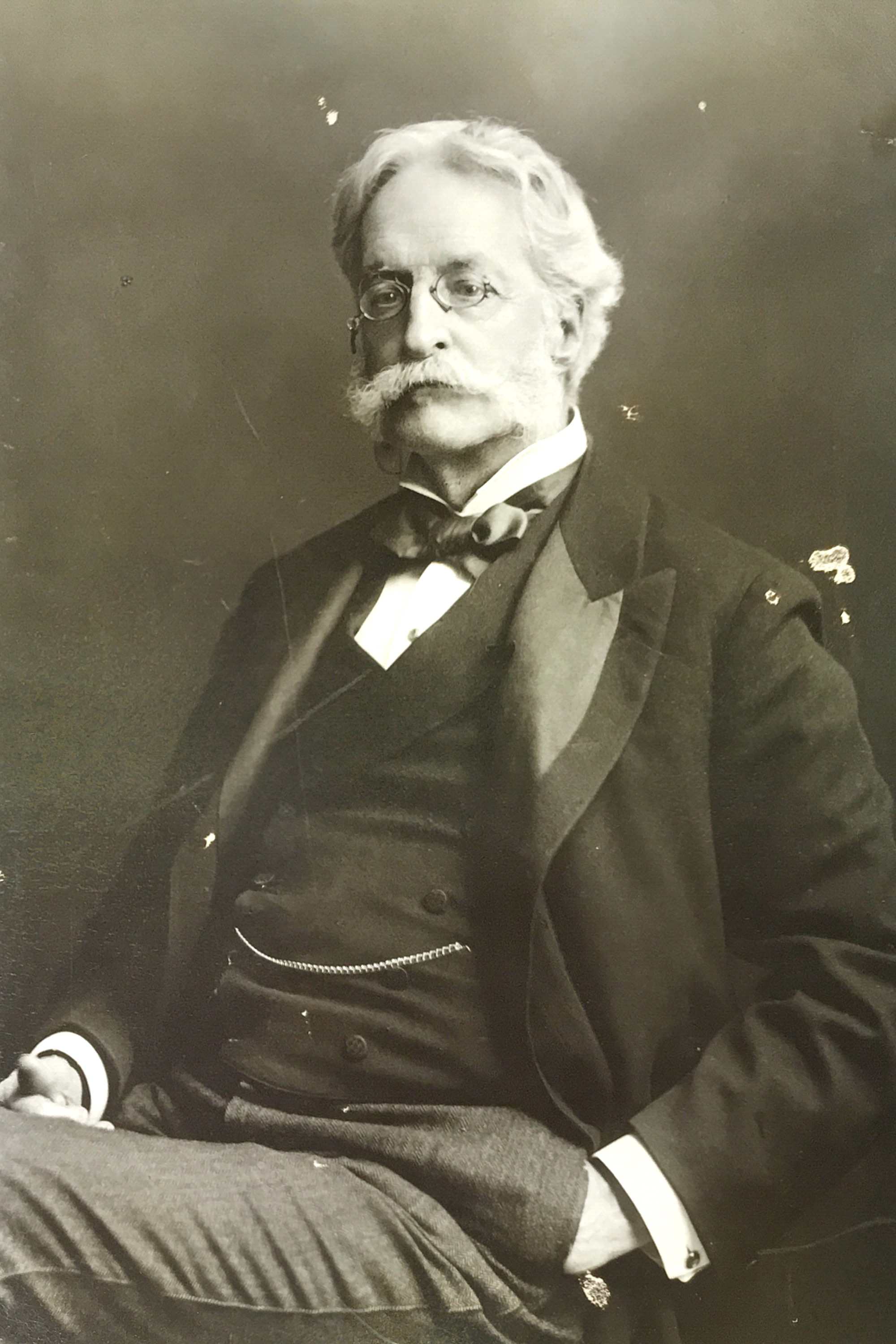
- Born: June 26, 1833; Boston, Massachusetts, U.S.
- Died: August 11, 1905 (aged 72); Boston, Massachusetts, U.S.
- Burial place: Mount Auburn Cemetery
- Education: Rensselaer Polytechnic Institute
- Occupation: Architect
- Relatives: Moses Kimball (father-in-law)
- Practice: Cummings and Sears

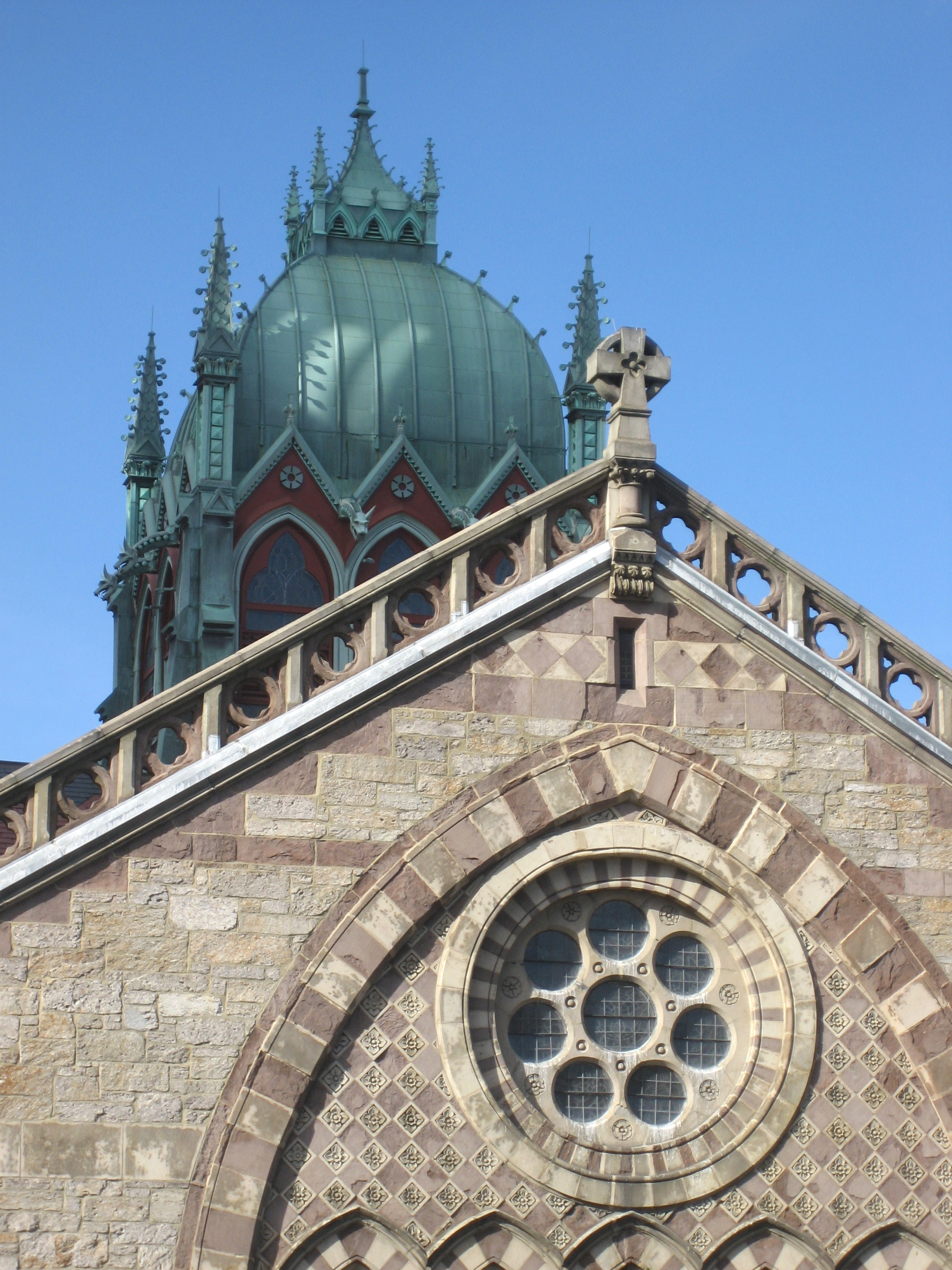
Lantern and exterior chancel wall at Old South Church in Boston.

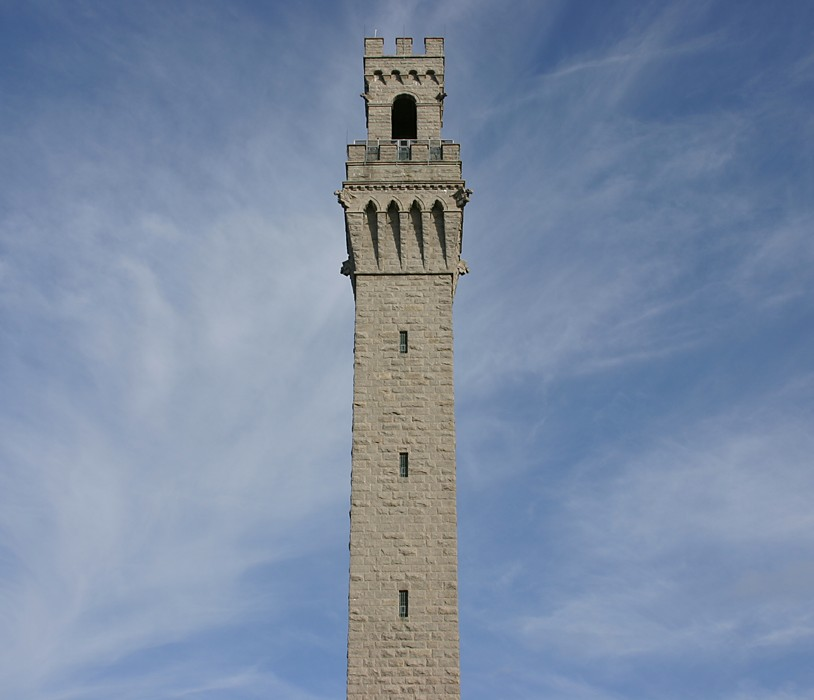
The Pilgrim Monument in Provincetown, Massachusetts.

Charles Amos Cummings (June 26, 1833 – August 11, 1905) was a nineteenth-century American architect and architectural historian who worked primarily in the Venetian Gothic style. Cummings followed the precepts of British cultural theorist and architectural critic John Ruskin (1819–1900). Cummings help to found the Boston Society of Architects in 1867.

== Biography ==
Born June 26, 1833, in Boston, Cummings was educated in the Boston Public Schools. Cummings graduated from the Rensselaer Polytechnic Institute in Troy, New York. Returning to Boston, Cummings joined the office of architect Gridley Bryant, where he met Willard T. Sears. In 1861 the two left Bryant's office to form their own architectural studio, Cummings and Sears.

Cummings traveled extensively in Europe, primarily Italy. Travel, and writing about Italian architecture informed his own work, and while a part of the larger Gothic Revival style, Cummings and his partner Sears were not rigorous academic revivalists.

Two early projects of the firm, Brechin Hall built in 1861, and Stone Chapel built in 1867 both at Phillips Academy in Andover, Massachusetts brought positive notice, and increased commissions to the firm. The office designed the massive brick Boston Cyclorama built to exhibit a large cyclical mural The Battle of Gettysburg, today it houses the Boston Center for the Arts. Just down the block from the Cyclorama building, the firm designed the Tremont Livery Stable at 439 Tremont Street. In 1871 Cummings designed a home for himself at 109 Newbury Street and in 1872 the firm designed a large Stick Style residence at 121 Commonwealth Avenue in Boston's Back Bay, and the smaller but significant Pratt House in Forest Hills, also in the Stick Style. Some 20 Back Bay houses were designed by Cummings and Sears from 1869 through 1887.

Following Boston's Great Fire of 1872, the firm was enlisted in the reconstruction of many downtown buildings. A significant part of Cummings and Sears practice focused on ecclesiastical architecture, building churches throughout Massachusetts and northern New England. In 1874 Cummings was commissioned to design what is considered his masterwork, a new building for the third oldest congregation in America, Old South Church in Boston located in Boston's Copley Square. Also completed in the same year was the Bedford Block which is an example of Venetian Gothic architecture.

In 1896, Cummings spoke out against proposals to tear down the State House and then began serving as a consulting architect for the work to maintain and expand it, while also writing a 10-page Introduction to a biography of its original architect, Charles Bulfinch.

Cummings continued to work, almost until his own death in 1911. His last major commission was the design of the Pilgrim Monument in Provincetown, Massachusetts. The monument took the form of a 220' tower, built as an Italian campanile specifically modeled after the Torre del Mangia in Siena, Italy. The monument's cornerstone was dedicated in 1907 by Theodore Roosevelt and the completed building dedicated in 1910 by William Howard Taft.

== Personal life ==
Cummings was married in 1869 to Margaret Joseph Kimball (daughter of Moses Kimball), and they had one daughter and two sons. One son, Charles K. Cummings (1870-1955), was also an architect in Boston. His works include Willowdale in Topsfield, built in 1902. The other son, Francis Hathaway Cummings (1872-1897), died of tuberculosis after hiking in the U.K.

Cummings collected a vast number of medieval sculptures, and on his death bequeathed the collection to the Museum of Fine Arts, Boston, also funding the Charles Amos Cummings Bequest Fund for the collection and care of ancient sculpture for the museum.

Cummings was descended from Isaac Cummings (1601-1677) who immigrated from Mistley, Essex in England to Massachusetts in 1635 and was among the founders of the towns of Ipswich and Topsfield, Massachusetts.

== Publishing ==
Cummings wrote several treatises on Italian architecture. In 1901 he published his largest work A history of architecture in Italy from the time of Constantine to the dawn of the renaissance with over 500 illustrations. In the same year, with Russell Sturgis, he published the Dictionary of Architecture and Building, which became a standard architectural text book.
