= Hotel Boylston =

Coordinates: 42°21′8.44″N 71°3′51.91″W

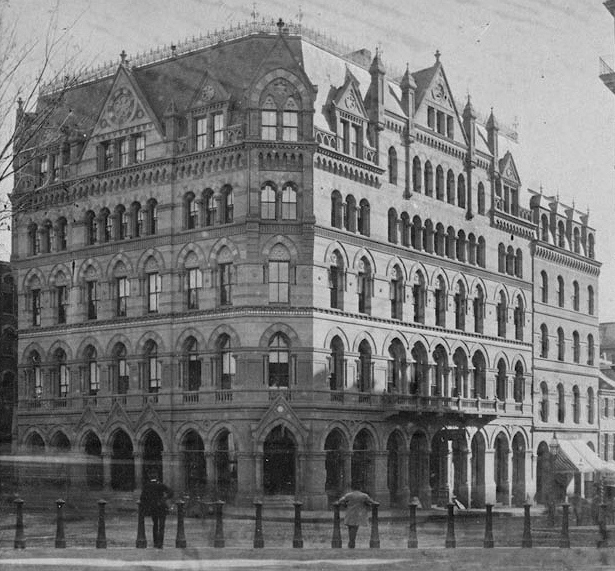
Hotel Boylston, Boston, 19th century

Hotel Boylston (1871-1894) of Boston, Massachusetts, stood at the corner of Tremont Street and Boylston Street in today's Boston Theater District. The architecture firm of Cummings and Sears designed it "in the Italian-Gothic style" as a residential apartment building. Among the tenants: New England Kennel Club; Christian Science Publishing Co.; and piano dealer Steinert & Sons and its 350-seat concert hall.
