= Magnolia, Massachusetts =

- Village
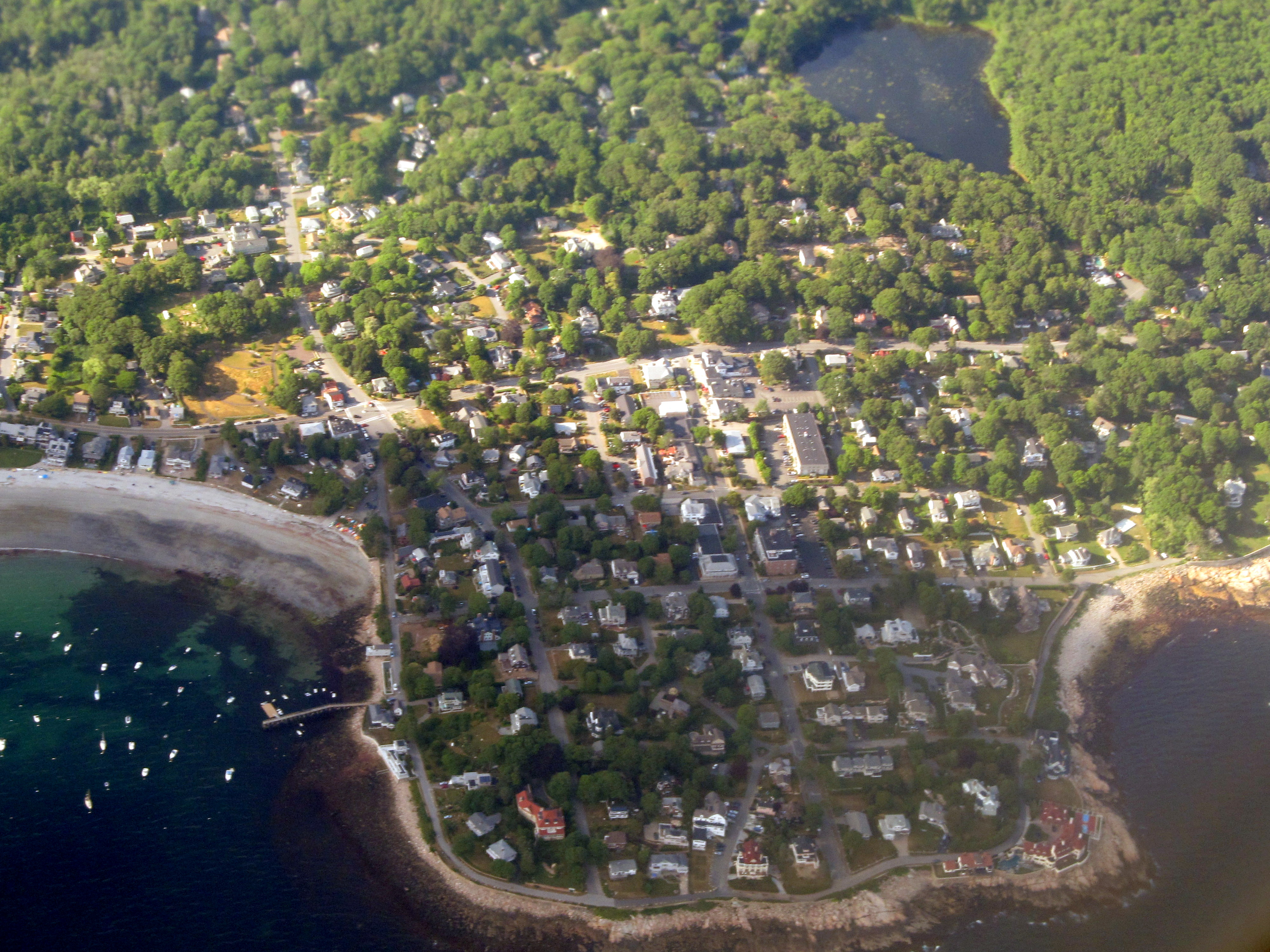
- Aerial view of Magnolia village in 2016

- Location within Massachusetts Location within the United States
- Coordinates: 42°34′30″N 70°42′45″W
- Country: United States
- State: Massachusetts
- County: Essex
- City: Gloucester
- Time zone: UTC-5 (Eastern)
- ZIP Code: 01930 (Gloucester)

Magnolia is a small village in Gloucester, located in Essex County, Massachusetts, United States, on the Manchester-by-the-Sea town line in the southwestern part of the city. Straddling the town line between the two communities is Surf Park, a two-acre swath of land that has scenic views of Kettle Cove.

Magnolia has its own library, restaurants, and shops. Another feature of Magnolia is its beach, which goes by the official name Gray Beach and is a part of Coolidge Reservation. Union Congregational Church is located in Magnolia, as is Hammond Castle. The village has its own Women's Community Club, which has been in existence for over 60 years.

== History ==
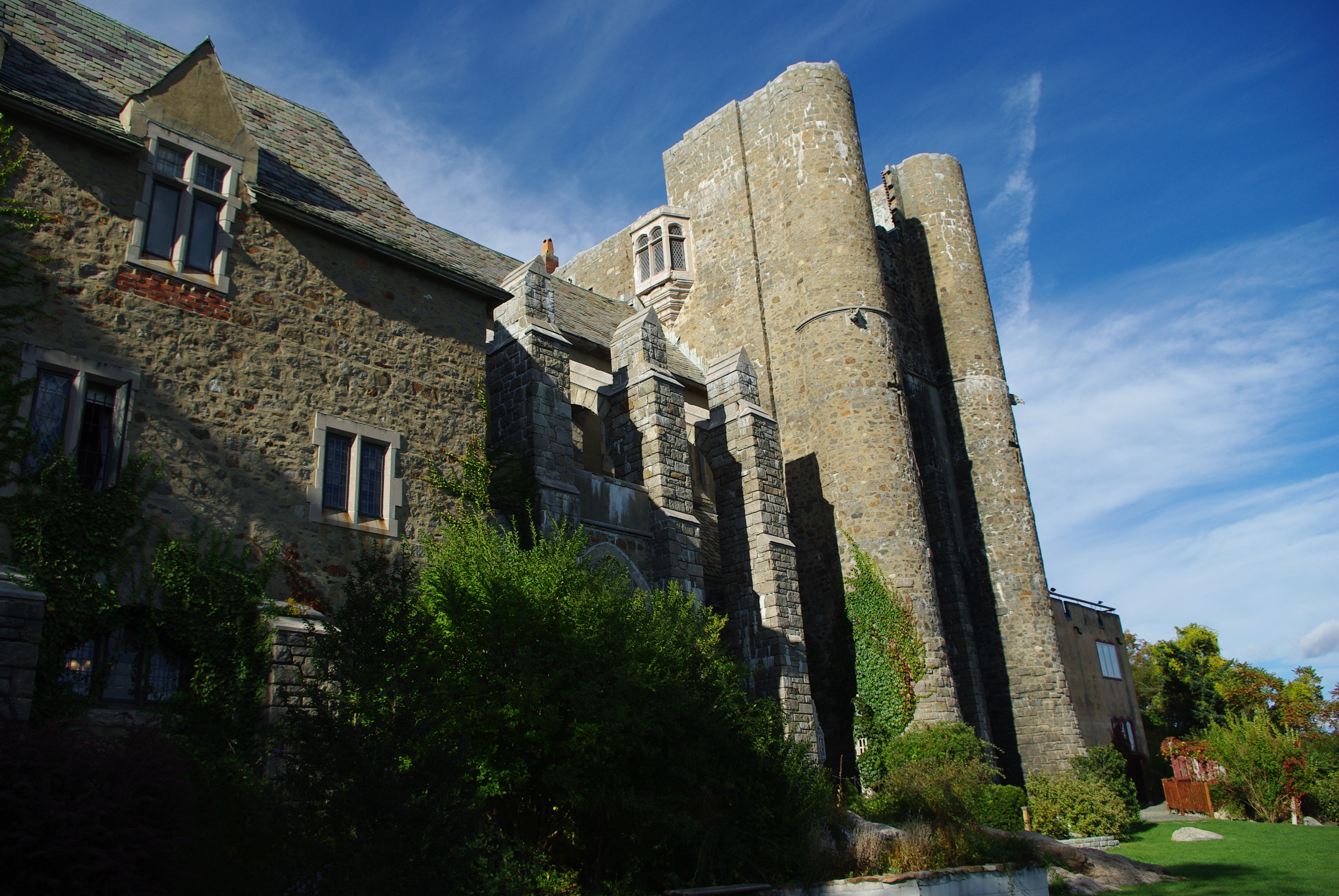
Hammond Castle

After the Civil War, Bostonians began to summer in Magnolia. For example, Rev. James Freeman Clarke, well-known Unitarian minister, author, and social reformer of Boston's Church of the Disciples, after searching the North Shore for the best possible summer resort, purchased land in Magnolia in 1879 and built a house he called "Septingle" because it had seven open fireplaces. It was constructed on a cliff overlooking the rocky shore and the curving beach on its left. Clarke often walked on that beach for relaxation or sat on the long piazza of his house while working on one of his many books. Everywhere he saw scarlet lilies and red wild roses, green bushes and vines, and heard gulls in the sky and the ever constant surf. The center of Magnolia was but a short stroll along a footpath, and trains from nearby Manchester made it convenient to get to Boston. Here, he and his family enjoyed the summers of the 1880s.

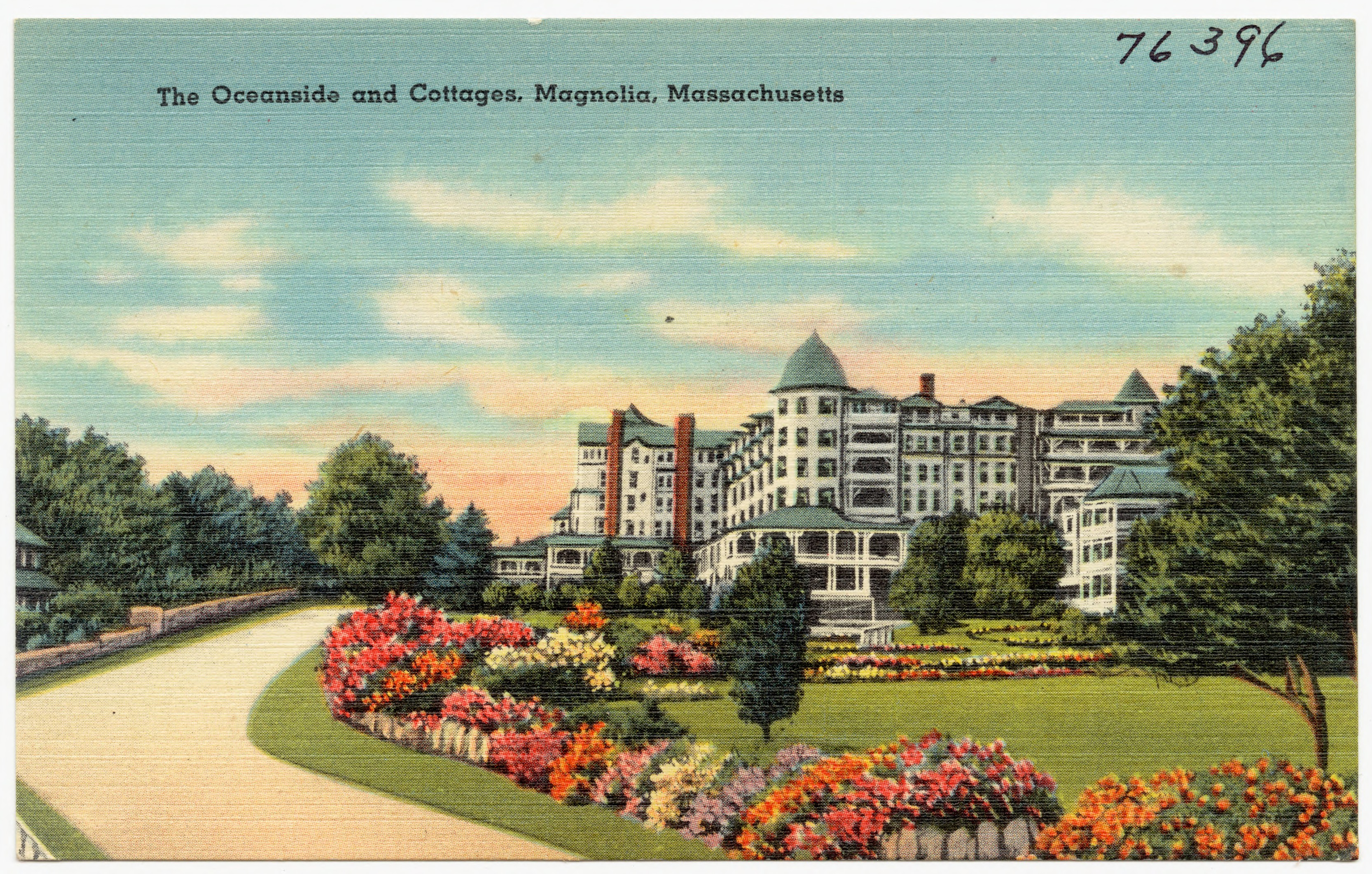
The Oceanside and cottages

At the dawn of the twentieth century, Magnolia was well known as a vacation destination. The Oceanside Hotel and Casino, before it burnt down, attracted several big names in music and film. John Philip Sousa and Lucille Ball were among those known to vacation in Magnolia. During the Victorian era, many wealthy businessmen and their families built large mansions along Shore Road, which were staffed by newly arrived immigrants to Massachusetts. They served the transient summer residents and visitors as servants, cooks, housekeepers, gardeners and clerks in the posh branch stores of firms from New York City, London, Paris, and Palm Beach that lined both sides of Lexington Avenue. Some of them were able to save their money and opened local businesses such as the Magnolia Hand Laundry that was located on Field Road.

== Historical sites ==
- "Archived copy".
