= Dublin Village Historic District =

Historic district in New Hampshire, United States

- U.S. National Register of Historic Places
- U.S. Historic district
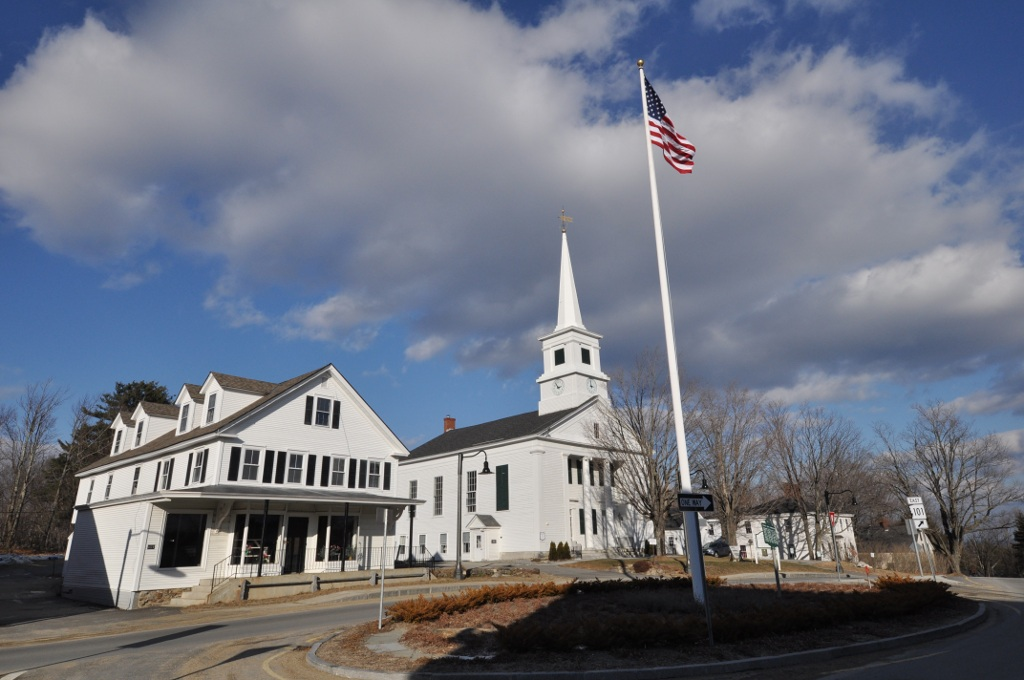
- The rotary at Main and Church, with the Community Church

- Location within New Hampshire Location within the United States
- Location: Old Common and Harrisville Rds., and Main and Church Sts., Dublin, New Hampshire
- Area: 899 acres (364 ha)
- Architect: Multiple
- Architectural style: Colonial Revival, Shingle Style
- MPS: Dublin MRA
- NRHP reference No.: 83004019
- Added to NRHP: December 15, 1983

The Dublin Village Historic District encompasses the historic village center of Dublin, New Hampshire. Dublin's center developed in the 19th century after its original village center was abandoned due to harsher winter conditions nearer Dublin Pond. The district extends along Main Street (New Hampshire Route 101) from its junction with Lake Street in the west to the junction with Old County Road in the east, and includes sections of Old Common Road, Harrisville Road, and Church Street. The district was listed on the National Register of Historic Places in 1983.

Settlement of Dublin began in the 1760s, and the town was incorporated in 1771. Its original town common, cemetery, and pound are located at the western end of the district, near the eastern end of Dublin Pond. This area was subjected to harsh winds blowing across the lake, and the current town center took shape in a more sheltered area further east. The central feature of the village is the intersection of the Main and Church Streets, where the 1852 Dublin Community Church and 1883 town hall are located. The most prominent commercial building to the west of this intersection are the wood frame publishing offices of Yankee magazine. A little further west is the 1901 Gothic Revival library.

Just north of Main Street and along Harrisville Road lies the campus of the Dublin School, on which stand a number of 19th century homes. East of the central intersection on Main Street is the lower village, a stretch that is predominantly residential, with an array of houses that are predominantly Greek Revival in their styling.

== See also ==
- National Register of Historic Places listings in Cheshire County, New Hampshire
