= Willard T. Sears =

American architect (1837–1920)

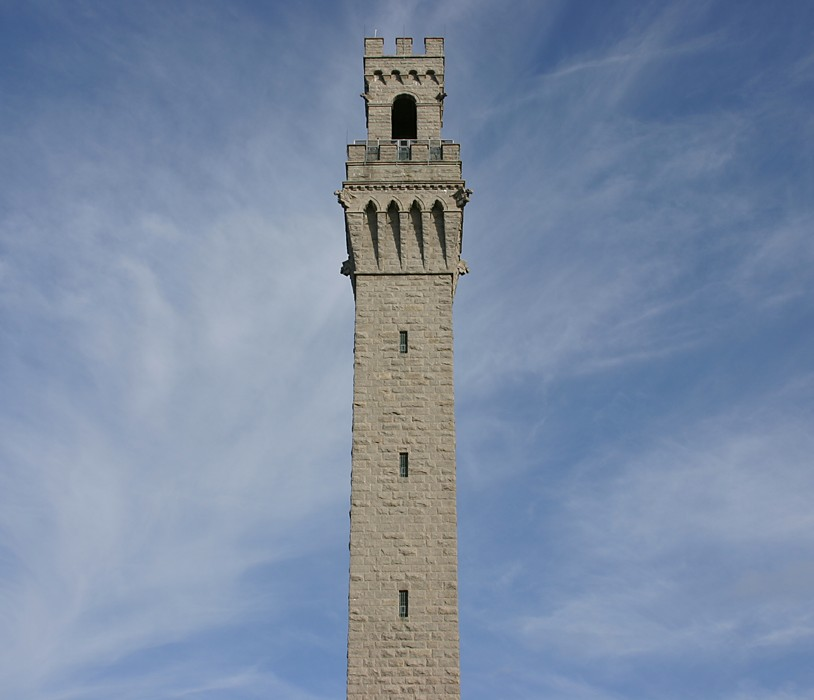
The Pilgrim Monument in Provincetown, Massachusetts.

Willard Thomas Sears (November 5, 1837 – May 21, 1920) was a prominent New England architect of the nineteenth and early twentieth centuries who worked primarily in the Gothic Revival and Renaissance Revival styles.

In 1861, Sears opened an architectural studio with Charles Amos Cummings. Together as Cummings and Sears, they designed many significant buildings, primarily ecclesiastical and academic, in and around Boston, including Brechin Hall and the Stone Chapel at Phillips Academy in Andover, the Old South Church on Copley Square (1875), and the Cyclorama (1884).

The firm of Sears and Cummings was also capable of designing utilitarian projects and did the design of a number of aqueducts and railroad bridges. They formed a development company which intended to construct an elevated railway in Brooklyn, New York Kings County Elevated Railway but being out of towners were not able to get political co-operation and sold off the design and rights. The executive in charge was Judge Hiram Bond.

In 1896, Sears was hired by Isabella Stewart Gardner to design her home, Fenway Court, in Boston's Fenway neighborhood. Upon her death Fenway Court became the Isabella Stewart Gardner Museum. In 1897, he designed what would become the Roosevelt Cottage for Mrs. Hartman Kuhn at what would become (in 1964) the Roosevelt Campobello International Park in New Brunswick, Canada. In 1898, Sears was commissioned to design the Pilgrim Monument in Provincetown, Massachusetts.

Upon his death his practice was succeeded by his grandson, architect Edward Sears Read.
