= Walter Young =

Walter Young may refer to:

- Walter Young (American football) (born 1979), American football wide receiver
- Walter Young (athlete), Canadian runner, winner of the 1937 Boston Marathon
- Walter Young (baseball) (1980–2015), Major League player with the Baltimore Orioles
- Walter C. Young (born 1923), Florida state representative
- Walter D. Young (1933–1984), Canadian political scientist and author
- Walter H. Young, American college football and basketball coach
- Walter James Young (1872–1940), Australian businessman
- Walter X. Young (1918–1942), United States Marine Corps officer during World War II
  - USS Walter X. Young (APD-131)
  - USS Walter X. Young (DE-723)
- Waddy Young (Walter Roland Young, 1916–1945), American football player and World War II bomber pilot
- Walter Young (minister) (1745–1814) Scottish minister, musician and collector of traditional songs

== See also ==
- Walter Yonge (disambiguation)
