= USS Walter X. Young =

USS Walter X. Young has been the name of more than one United States Navy ship, but only one that was actually completed and served in the Navy:

- USS Walter X. Young (DE-723) a Rudderow-class destroyer escort whose construction order was canceled in 1944
- USS Walter X. Young (DE-715), a Rudderow-class destroyer that was escort converted during construction into the fast transport USS Walter X. Young (APD-131).
- USS Walter X. Young (APD-131), a Crosley-class high speed transport in commission from 1945 to 1946

== See also ==
- USS Young
- USS John Young
