= USS Young =

Two ships in the United States Navy have been named USS Young, the first for John Young (c. 1740–1781), a captain in the Continental Navy, and the second for Rear Admiral Lucien Young (1852–1912).

- The first, USS Young (DD-312) was a Clemson-class destroyer, launched in 1919 and wrecked in the Honda Point Disaster of 1923.
- The second, USS Young (DD-580) was a Fletcher-class destroyer, launched in 1942 and stricken in 1968.

== See also ==
- USS Cassin Young (DD-793), a Fletcher-class destroyer
- USS John Young was also named for Captain Young. She was launched in 1976 and stricken in 2002.
- USS Walter X. Young, a destroyer escort
