= Dimock Community Health Center Complex =

- New England Hospital for Women and Children; Dimock Community Health Center Complex
- U.S. National Register of Historic Places
- U.S. National Historic Landmark
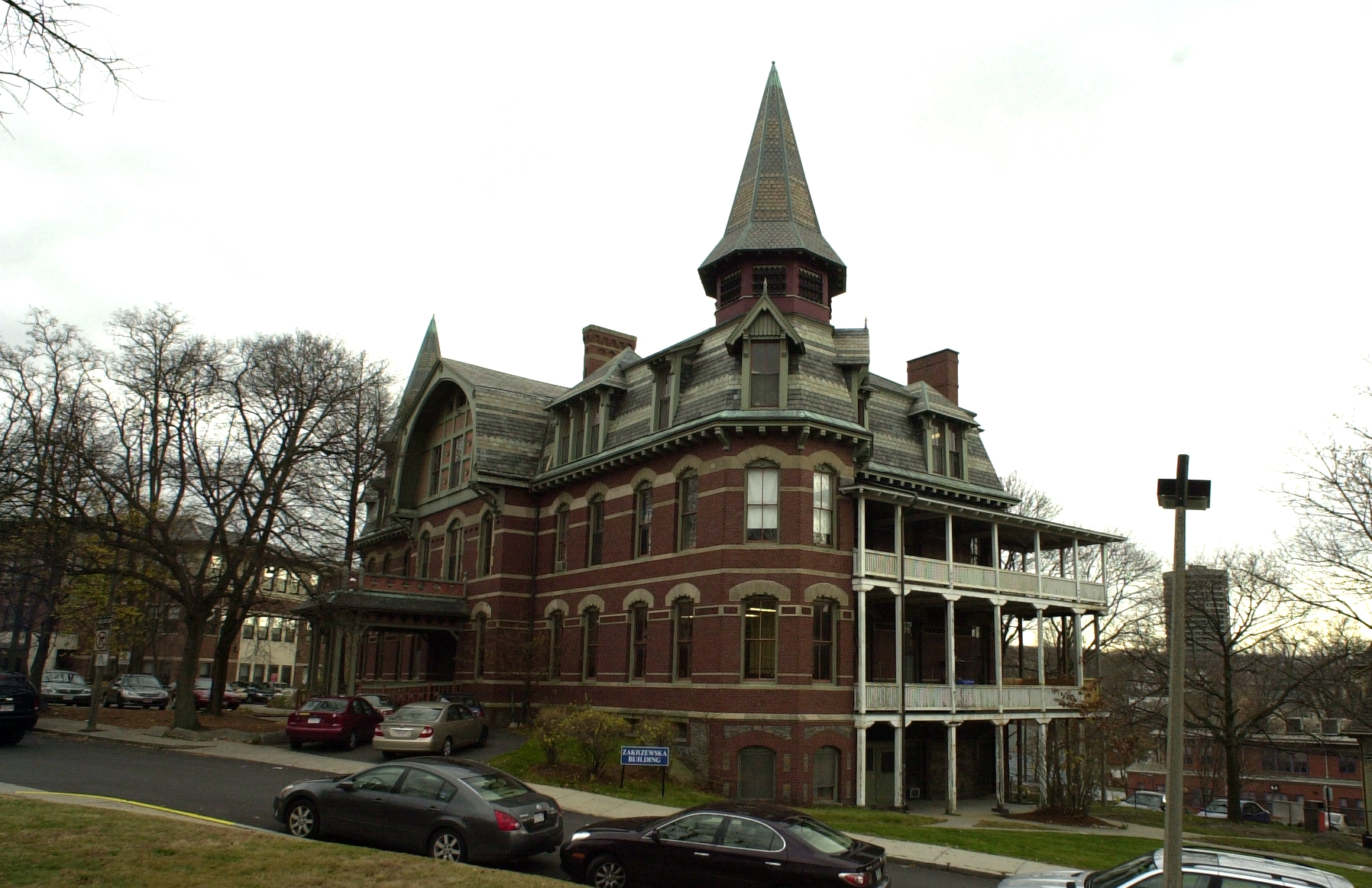
- The Zakrzewska building

- Location within Massachusetts Location within the United States
- Location: 41 and 55 Dimock St., Boston, Massachusetts
- Coordinates: 42°19′9.5″N 71°5′49.7″W
- Area: 10 acres (4.0 ha)
- Built: 1872
- Architect: Cummings & Sears; Fox, James A.
- Architectural style: Late Victorian, Late 19th And 20th Century Revivals
- NRHP reference No.: 85000317
- Added to NRHP: February 21, 1985

The Dimock Community Health Center Complex (formerly the New England Hospital for Women and Children complex) is a historic medical complex at 41 and 55 Dimock Street in Boston, Massachusetts.

The center's Zakrzewska Building was built in the Stick style of architecture in 1872, designed by Charles Amos Cummings and Willard T. Sears. This facility was the first in New England and the second in the United States to be run by female doctors. Contemporary renovations were completed by James A. Fox and it was added to the National Register of Historic Places in 1985. In 1991 the complex was declared a National Historic Landmark (as "New England Hospital for Women and Children"; the National Register listing is for "Dimock Community Health Center Complex").

== See also ==
- List of National Historic Landmarks in Boston
- National Register of Historic Places listings in southern Boston, Massachusetts
