= Anne Gunn =

Scottish musician and inventor (1756 – c. 1813)

Anne Gunn (née Young; 11 April 1756 – c. 1813) was a Scottish music teacher and the inventor of Musical Games, a set of board games designed to teach music theory to children. She was granted the first British patent for a board game, the only patent granted to a female inventor in 1801.

== Early life and education ==
She was born in Haddington in East Lothian to David (d. 1758) and Janet Young (née Johnstone). David Young was appointed the first Doctor of the Haddington Grammar School with his duties designated as “Vocall & Instrumental Musick”. He later became rector of the grammar school. Anne was the youngest of 11 children. Her brother, Walter Young was also known to be a skilled musician and song collector, who consulted with Robert Burns. He was ordained as a Church of Scotland minister in 1769. Anne stated that her musical ability (particularly her knowledge of music theory) was developed by her father and brother.

== Early career ==
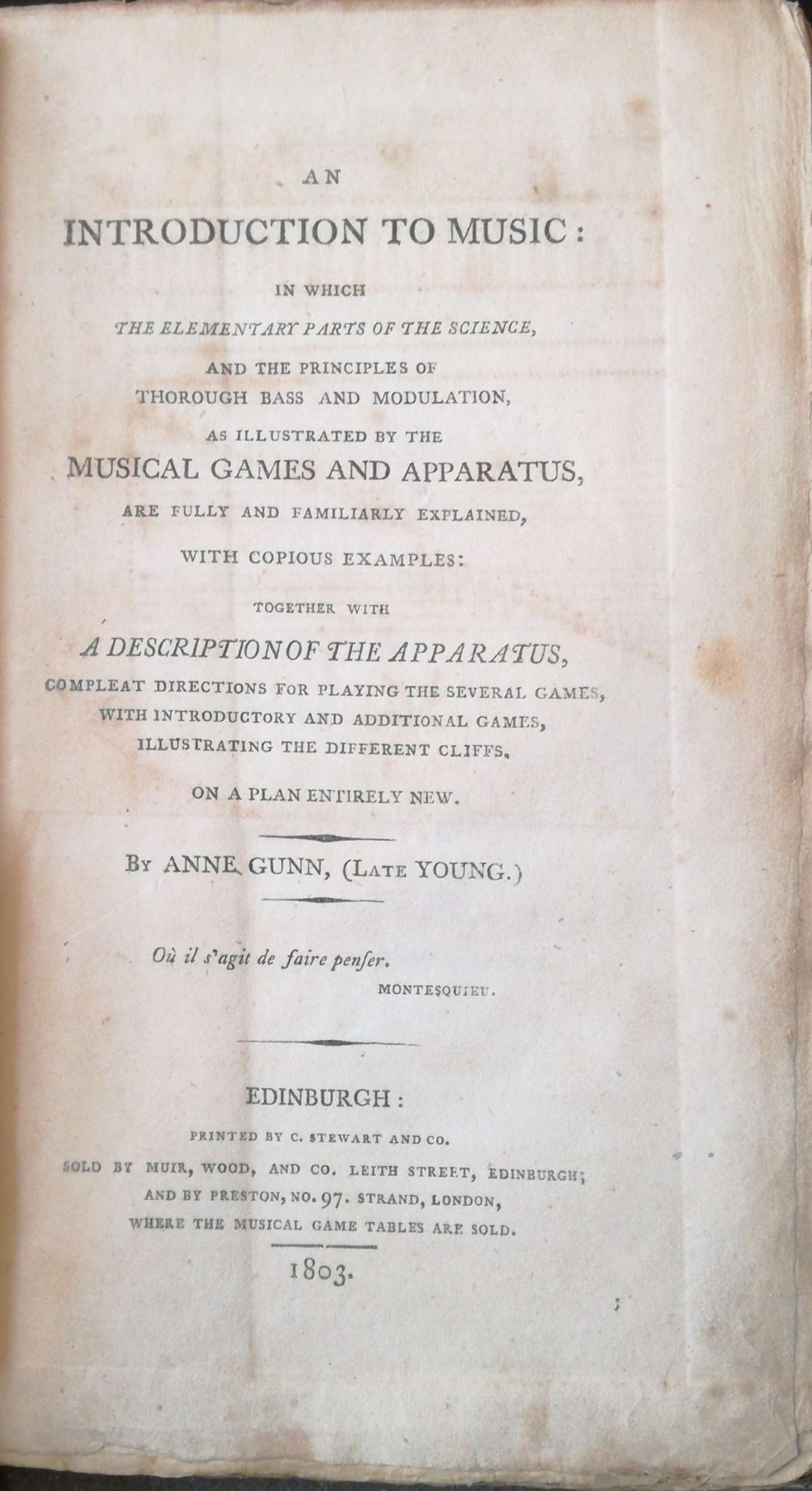
Cover of An Introduction to Music

Young worked as a music teacher in Edinburgh providing instruction for young ladies. She published two musical treatises instructing on how to play and read music. The first treatise was Elements of Music and of Fingering the Harpsichord (originally published anonymously c.1790 before it was reissued with her name c.1802) and the second was An Introduction to Music, published in 1803 shortly after she was married.

== Musical Games ==
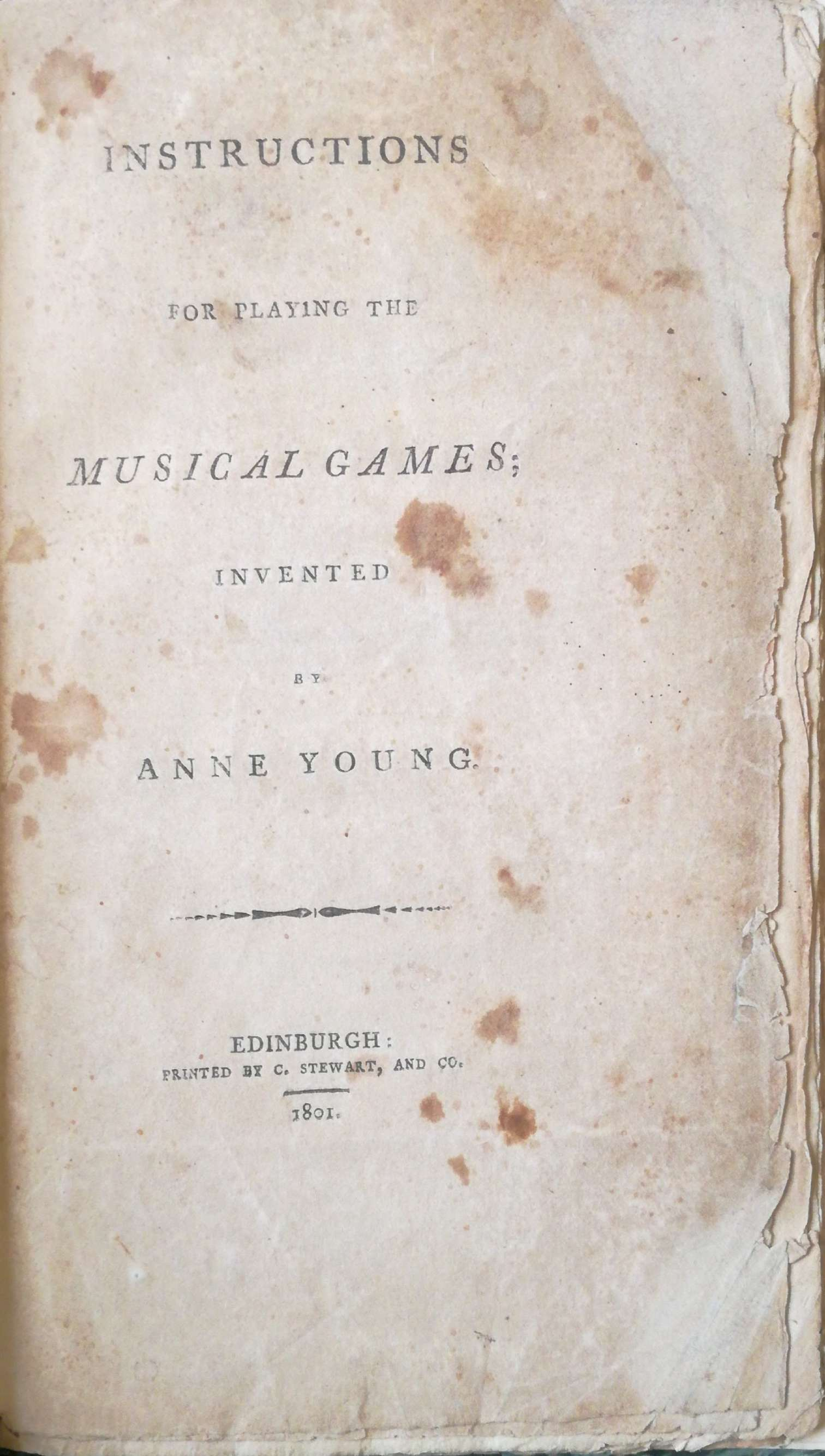
Cover of Instructions for Playing the Musical Games

On 16 March 1801, Young was granted a Royal patent for her Musical Games, a series of six games to teach the rudiments of music theory. The games were played on a custom board set in a mahogany box, with custom wooden pins and ivory dice. This was the first British patent granted for a board game and the only patent granted to a female inventor in 1801. A book of instructions was initially sold with the board; however, Gunn later revised the instructions and added more games.

Young advised that the board game was for children, noting that teaching musical theory was often dull for both the teacher and the pupil since it required a lot of repetition to embed the fundamental concepts. In creating the games, she hoped to better engage children in learning music, observing that:

‘There is one thing, however, in which all children agree, and that is a fondness for sport or play. Proceeding upon this principle, various successful attempts have been made to invent certain sports or games, which afford amusement, and at the same time communicate, or impress upon the memory, some branches of useful knowledge.’

Each of the games instructed players on how to identify clefs, intervals, cadences, scales, chords, and modulations.

An Introduction to Music provided more detailed instructions on how to play each of the games. Gunn also added a new introductory game on key signatures, noting that this was in response to some criticism received after the board was initially released in 1801.

After her death, An Introduction to Music was reissued in 1820, which included six more "Elementary Games". These games taught the basic fundamentals of musical theory and were likely designed to be played before progressing onto the original 1801/03 games. It is unclear if Anne intended to publish these Elementary Games before her death.

== Personal life ==
She married writer and cellist John Gunn at St Cuthbert’s Church, Edinburgh on 20 July 1802. After her marriage, she no longer worked as a music teacher.

In letters to Margaret Clephane, Gunn revealed that his wife was placed in an asylum in late October 1811. The exact asylum is not identified, though Kennaway suggests it was likely one of the private asylums in Edinburgh. In a letter dated 31 January 1814, he mentioned that his wife had died in 1813, though he did not specify the exact date.
