= Walter Yonge =

Walter Yonge may refer to:

- Walter Yonge (died 1649) (1579–1649), English lawyer, merchant and diarist
- Sir Walter Yonge, 2nd Baronet (c.1625–1670), English MP, grandson of the above
- Sir Walter Yonge, 3rd Baronet (1653–1731), British MP, son of the above

== See also ==
- Walter Young (disambiguation)
