= List of National Historic Landmarks in Boston =

This is a list of National Historic Landmarks in Boston, Massachusetts. It includes 57 properties and districts designated as National Historic Landmarks in the city of Boston, Massachusetts, United States. Another 131 National Historic Landmarks are located in the remaining parts of the state of Massachusetts. Boston has more National Historic Landmarks per square mile than any other major city in the US.

== Key ==
	National Historic Landmark
^{†}	National Historic Landmark District
^{#}	National Historic Site, National Historical Park, National Memorial, or National Monument
^{*}	Delisted Landmark

== Current National Historic Landmarks ==
The National Historic Landmarks in Boston are spread out over many neighborhoods, from the waterfront to Jamaica Plain.

	Landmark name	Image	Date designated	Location	Description
1	African Meeting House	African Meeting House	May 30, 1974 (#71000087)	8 Smith Ct; Beacon Hill; 42°21′36″N 71°03′56″W	Also known as the First African Baptist Church, it was built in 1806 and is now the oldest black church edifice still standing in the United States.
2	Nathan Appleton Residence	Nathan Appleton Residence	December 22, 1977 (#77001541)	39–40 Beacon Street; Beacon Hill; 42°21′25″N 71°03′59″W	Residence of Nathan Appleton, a businessman involved in expanding the textile industry. His son-in-law was Henry Wadsworth Longfellow, who married Appleton's daughter Fanny in this house.
3	Arnold Arboretum	Arnold Arboretum	January 12, 1965 (#66000127)	Jamaica Plain; 42°17′52″N 71°07′22″W	Harvard University-owned arboretum, founded in 1872 and designed by Frederick Law Olmsted.
4	Frederick Ayer Mansion	Frederick Ayer Mansion	April 5, 2005 (#05000459)	395 Commonwealth Ave. Back Bay; 42°20′57″N 71°05′25″W	The home of textile businessman Frederick Ayer, its interior is one of few designed by Louis Comfort Tiffany, and its exterior has the only surviving instance of an outside mosaic by Tiffany.
5^{†}	Beacon Hill Historic District	Beacon Hill Historic District	December 29, 1962 (#66000130)	Beacon Hill; 42°21′30″N 71°03′58″W	This architecturally significant neighborhood includes buildings designed by Charles Bulfinch, and has been home to many famous people, including nationally prominent politicians, businessmen, and academics.
6	Boston Athenæum	Boston Athenæum	December 21, 1965 (#66000132)	10 1/2 Beacon Street; Beacon Hill; 42°21′30″N 71°03′43″W	Home of one of the nation's oldest and largest independent private libraries, this building was designed by Edward Clarke Cabot.
7^{†}	Boston Common	Boston Common	February 27, 1987 (#87000760)	Beacon Hill; 42°21′18″N 71°03′56″W	Established in 1634, the Common is the nation's oldest public park.
8	Boston Light	Boston Light	January 29, 1964 (#66000133)	Little Brewster Island; Boston Harbor; 42°19′40″N 70°53′24″W	The nation's second oldest standing lighthouse, Boston Light was built on the site of the first lighthouse in what is now the United States. It is the only lighthouse permanently staffed by the United States Coast Guard.
9^{†}	Boston Naval Shipyard	Boston Naval Shipyard	November 13, 1966 (#66000134)	Charlestown; 42°22′26″N 71°03′23″W	One of the USA's oldest shipyards, this shipyard is home to two NHL ships (USS Constitution and USS Cassin Young), and has the only surviving ropewalk that has not been moved or significantly altered.
10^{†}	Boston Public Garden	Boston Public Garden	February 27, 1987 (#87000761)	Back Bay; 42°21′15″N 71°04′12″W	The nation's first public botanical garden, it was laid out in the French Second Empire style in the 1860s.
11	Boston Public Library	Boston Public Library	February 24, 1986 (#73000317)	230 Dartmouth Street; Back Bay; 42°20′59″N 71°04′39″W	Built in the 1880s to a design by Charles Follen McKim inspired by similar European institutions, this building features murals by John Singer Sargent and Bates Hall, its large and light-filled reading room.
12	Brook Farm	Brook Farm	July 23, 1965 (#66000141)	670 Baker Street; West Roxbury; 42°17′29″N 71°10′27″W	Site of an experimental utopian community based on Transcendentalist and Unitarian thought.
13	Bunker Hill Monument	Bunker Hill Monument	January 20, 1961 (#66000138)	Charlestown; 42°22′35″N 71°03′39″W	This monument, built in the mid-19th century, stands atop Breed's Hill, site of most of the fighting in the 1775 Battle of Bunker Hill.
14	USS Cassin Young (destroyer)	USS Cassin Young (destroyer)	January 14, 1986 (#86000084)	Boston Navy Yard; Charlestown; 42°22′20″N 71°03′16″W	A Fletcher-class destroyer, USS Cassin Young was a ship of the United States Navy. Launched during the Second World War, she saw action in the Battle of Leyte and the Battle of Okinawa. She received seven battle stars and a Navy Unit Commendation for her war service.
15	Central Congregational Church	Central Congregational Church	October 16, 2012 (#12001012)	67 Newbury Street; Back Bay; 42°21′08″N 71°04′27″W	This church has the largest intact Tiffany-designed ecclesiastical interior in its original location in America.
16	USS Constitution (frigate)	USS Constitution (frigate)	December 19, 1960 (#66000789)	Boston Navy Yard; Charlestown; 42°22′20″N 71°03′20″W	The world's oldest floating commissioned naval vessel. Launched in 1797, she saw action in the Quasi-War and the War of 1812. She later became a training ship, and presently serves as a museum ship. She last sailed under her own power in August, 2012, to commemorate the 200th anniversary of her victory over Guerriere.
17	Ether Dome, Massachusetts General Hospital	Ether Dome, Massachusetts General Hospital	January 12, 1965 (#66000366)	55 Fruit Street; West End; 42°21′49″N 71°04′04″W	The operating room of the Massachusetts General Hospital from 1821 to 1867, the Ether Dome was the site of the first public demonstration of the use of ether as an anesthetic.
18	Faneuil Hall	Faneuil Hall	October 9, 1960 (#66000368)	Downtown; 42°21′36″N 71°03′23″W	Built on the site of a building originally donated by Huguenot merchant Peter Faneuil to the city of Boston, this iconic market building and meeting house was built in the 1760s and expanded in the 19th century by architect Charles Bulfinch. It was the site of many public meetings during the American Revolution.
19	Fenway Studios	Fenway Studios	August 5, 1998 (#78000473)	Fenway–Kenmore; 42°20′51″N 71°05′23″W	This building was purpose-built as studios for artists in 1904–1905 in the Arts and Crafts style.
20^{†}	Fort Warren	Fort Warren	May 22, 1970 (#70000540)	Georges Island; 42°19′13″N 70°55′39″W	A 19th-century fortification built in Boston Harbor, Fort Warren saw service through the First World War. It is named for Dr. Joseph Warren, a Revolutionary War political leader who was killed in the Battle of Bunker Hill.
21	William Lloyd Garrison House	William Lloyd Garrison House	June 23, 1965 (#66000653)	125 Highland St. Roxbury; 42°19′33″N 71°05′36″W	Home of abolitionist leader William Lloyd Garrison, publisher of the anti-slavery newspaper The Liberator.
22	Gibson House	Gibson House	August 7, 2001 (#01001048)	137 Beacon Street; Back Bay; 42°21′18″N 71°04′28″W	This Victorian rowhouse is believed to be the only one of its type to preserve both internal and external architectural design elements. Designed by architect Edward Clarke Cabot, the house remained in one family until being opened as a house museum in 1957.
23	Chester Harding House	Chester Harding House	December 21, 1965 (#66000764)	16 Beacon Street; Beacon Hill; 42°21′29″N 71°03′45″W	Federal style home of portrait artist Chester Harding.
24	Harvard Stadium	Harvard Stadium	February 27, 1987 (#87000757)	95 North Harvard St. Allston; 42°21′59″N 71°07′38″W	Built in 1903, this stadium was the prototype for numerous other stadia, and was at the time the largest structure constructed from reinforced concrete.
25	Samuel Gridley and Julia Ward Howe House	Samuel Gridley and Julia Ward Howe House	May 30, 1974 (#74002044)	13 Chestnut Street; Beacon Hill; 42°21′28″N 71°04′00″W	Home of noted abolitionists Julia Ward Howe and Samuel Gridley Howe, designed by Charles Bulfinch.
26	King's Chapel	King's Chapel	October 9, 1960 (#74002045)	Corner of Tremont and School Street; Downtown; 42°21′29″N 71°03′37″W	Now home to a Unitarian Universalist congregation, King's Chapel was built on the site of the first Anglican church in Boston.
27	Lightship No. 112, "Nantucket"	Lightship No. 112, "Nantucket"	December 20, 1989 (#89002464)	East Boston; 42°21′40″N 71°02′07″W	The largest lightship ever built, and the last active lightship at the time of its nomination.
28	Long Wharf and Custom House Block	Long Wharf and Custom House Block	November 13, 1966 (#66000768)	Foot of State Street; Boston; 42°21′37″N 71°02′55″W	This wharf was constructed in the early 18th century, and was for many years one of the busiest commercial wharves in Great Britain's North American colonies. The wharf has been much shortened by land reclamation, and is now home to a hotel and other businesses.
29	Massachusetts General Hospital	Massachusetts General Hospital	December 30, 1970 (#70000682)	55 Fruit Street; West End; 42°21′49″N 71°04′03″W	The original building for the Massachusetts General Hospital, one of the nation's earliest public hospitals, was designed by Charles Bulfinch. It is the location of the Ether Dome, also a National Historic Landmark.
30	Massachusetts Historical Society Building	Massachusetts Historical Society Building	December 21, 1965 (#66000770)	1154 Boylston St. Fenway–Kenmore; 42°20′48″N 71°05′24″W	This building (built 1899) is home to the Massachusetts Historical Society, the oldest (founded 1791) historic society in the nation.
31	Massachusetts Statehouse	Massachusetts Statehouse	December 19, 1960 (#66000771)	Beacon Hill; 42°21′30″N 71°03′50″W	The state's capitol building, it was built in the 1790s to a design by Charles Bulfinch, with major additions executed in the 1890s to designs by Charles Brigham. The dome was originally sheathed by copper rolled by Paul Revere, but is now covered in gold leaf.
32	William C. Nell Residence	William C. Nell Residence	May 11, 1976 (#76001979)	3 Smith Ct; Beacon Hill; 42°21′36″N 71°03′55″W	Home of abolitionist and education advocate William Cooper Nell.
33	New England Conservatory of Music	New England Conservatory of Music	April 19, 1994 (#80000672)	30 Gainsborough Street; Fenway–Kenmore; 42°20′29″N 71°05′12″W	The conservatory's 1903 building houses Jordan Hall, a performance space noted for its excellent acoustics.
34	New England Hospital for Women and Children	New England Hospital for Women and Children	July 17, 1991 (#85000317)	41 and 55 Dimock St. Roxbury; 42°19′11″N 71°05′51″W	Designed by Charles Amos Cummings and Willard T. Sears and opened in 1872, this facility was the first public hospital run by women doctors in New England. The organization is now known as the Dimock Center.
35	Old City Hall	Old City Hall	December 30, 1970 (#70000687)	45 School St. Downtown; 42°21′29″N 71°03′33″W	This building was one of the first in the nation to be designed in the Second Empire style, and served as a prototype for other such buildings, including the Old Executive Office Building in Washington, DC. Designed by Gridley James Fox Bryant and Arthur Gilman, it served as city hall from 1865 to 1969.
36	Old North Church	Old North Church	January 20, 1961 (#66000776)	193 Salem St. North End; 42°21′59″N 71°03′17″W	This church, built in 1723 in a style inspired by English architect Christopher Wren, is the oldest active church building in Boston. It was where Paul Revere ordered lanterns hung ("one if by land, two if by sea, and I on the opposite shore will be") to notify others of British troop movements prior to the Battles of Lexington and Concord.
37	Old South Church in Boston	Old South Church in Boston	December 30, 1970 (#70000690)	645 Boylston St. Back Bay; 42°21′00″N 71°04′40″W	Built in 1873 to designs by Charles Amos Cummings and Willard T. Sears, this church is home to one of the city's oldest congregations (established 1670).
38	Old South Meeting House	Old South Meeting House	October 9, 1960 (#66000778)	310 Washington St. Downtown Crossing; 42°21′25″N 71°03′31″W	An active church as well as a museum, this 1729 building was where the Boston Tea Party was planned on December 16, 1773. It was also the site of other Revolutionary era public gatherings.
39	Old State House	Old State House	October 9, 1960 (#66000779)	206 Washington St. Downtown Crossing; 42°21′31″N 71°03′27″W	This building, constructed 1712, served as the seat of Massachusetts colonial and state government until 1793, when the current state house was built. It was outside this building that the Boston Massacre took place on March 5, 1770.
40	Old West Church	Old West Church	December 30, 1970 (#70000691)	131 Cambridge St. West End; 42°21′41″N 71°03′51″W	This 1806 church (designed by Asher Benjamin) was built on the site of an earlier church whose congregation was noted for its opposition to British rule. Its most famous preacher of the Revolutionary era was Jonathan Mayhew, who may have coined the phrase "no taxation without representation".
41	First Harrison Gray Otis House	First Harrison Gray Otis House	December 30, 1970 (#70000539)	141 Cambridge St. West End; 42°21′40″N 71°03′53″W	Home built for Federalist Party leader Harrison Gray Otis, designed by architect Charles Bulfinch.
42	Francis Parkman House	Francis Parkman House	December 29, 1962 (#66000782)	50 Chestnut St. Beacon Hill; 42°21′26″N 71°04′07″W	Home of noted historian and horticulturalist Francis Parkman.
43	Pierce–Hichborn House	Pierce–Hichborn House	October 18, 1968 (#68000042)	29 North Square; North End; 42°21′49″N 71°03′13″W	This house is a rare pre-Georgian brick house, built circa 1711. It is next door to the Paul Revere House, and owned by the Paul Revere Memorial Association.
44	William H. Prescott House	William H. Prescott House	December 29, 1964 (#66000765)	55 Beacon Street; Beacon Hill; 42°21′24″N 71°04′06″W	Also known as Headquarters House, this 1808 house (one half of a duplex rowhouse) was designed by Asher Benjamin and was home of the noted blind historian William H. Prescott.
45	Quincy Market	Quincy Market	November 13, 1966 (#66000784)	South Market St. Downtown; 42°21′37″N 71°03′18″W	Constructed under the auspices of Boston Mayor Josiah Quincy in the 1820s, the market was designed by architect Alexander Parris and built on land made by filling part of the harbor. The market is a popular tourist site.
46	Paul Revere House	Paul Revere House	January 20, 1961 (#66000785)	19 North Square; North End; 42°21′50″N 71°03′13″W	This house is Boston's oldest surviving house (built 1680). It was home to Revolutionary War hero, silversmith, and early industrialist Paul Revere, and is now a house museum on the city's Freedom Trail.
47	Ellen Swallow Richards Residence	Ellen Swallow Richards Residence	March 31, 1992 (#92001874)	32 Eliot St. Jamaica Plain; 42°18′42″N 71°07′03″W	Home of Ellen Swallow Richards, who was the first female graduate of the Massachusetts Institute of Technology, and the first woman to receive an advanced degree in chemistry.
48	Roseway (Schooner)	Roseway (Schooner)	September 25, 1997 (#97001278)	Boston Harbor; 44°12′38″N 69°03′46″W	Launched on November 24, 1925, in Essex, this wooden gaff-rigged schooner was used primarily for competitive racing.
49	St. Paul's Church	St. Paul's Church	December 30, 1970 (#70000730)	130 Tremont Street; Beacon Hill; 42°21′21″N 71°03′45″W	This Greek Revival church was built in 1819 to a design by Alexander Parris. It was the first Episcopal church built in post-independence Boston, and is now the cathedral church of the Episcopal Diocese of Massachusetts.
50	David Sears House	David Sears House	December 30, 1970 (#70000731)	42-43 Beacon Street; Beacon Hill; 42°21′24″N 71°04′00″W	This 1816 townhouse was owned by David Sears, a Boston developer, politician, and philanthropist. The Federal-style structure has a facade of carved granite.
51	Shirley–Eustis House	Shirley–Eustis House	October 9, 1960 (#66000787)	33 Shirley St. Roxbury; 42°19′25″N 71°04′19″W	Built in the late 1740s by colonial governor William Shirley, this Georgian house was also home to Massachusetts Governor William Eustis.
52	Charles Sumner House	Charles Sumner House	November 7, 1973 (#73001953)	20 Hancock St. Beacon Hill; 42°21′37″N 71°03′52″W	This c. 1806 Federal-style townhouse was home to Charles Sumner, a US Senator and vocal abolitionist.
53	Symphony Hall	Symphony Hall	January 20, 1999 (#99000633)	301 Massachusetts Ave. Fenway–Kenmore; 42°20′33″N 71°05′09″W	This hall has been home to the Boston Symphony Orchestra since 1900, when it was built to a design by McKim, Mead, and White. The performance space is noted for its excellent acoustics.
54	Tremont Street Subway	Tremont Street Subway	January 29, 1964 (#66000788)	Downtown; 42°21′17″N 71°03′50″W	The oldest subway tunnel in North America, this tunnel entered service in 1897, and is still in service today.
55	Trinity Church	Trinity Church	December 30, 1970 (#70000733)	Copley Square; Back Bay; 42°21′00″N 71°04′29″W	Built in the 1870s to a design by H. H. Richardson, this church is an archetype of the Richardsonian Romanesque style, and is recognized as one of the "Ten Most Significant Buildings in the United States" by the American Institute of Architects. Its congregation dates to the 1730s.
56	William Monroe Trotter House	William Monroe Trotter House	May 11, 1976 (#76002003)	97 Sawyer Ave. Dorchester; 42°18′46″N 71°03′45″W	Home of African-American journalist and Harvard graduate William Monroe Trotter. Trotter publisher The Guardian, and meetings of African-American activists, W. E. B. Du Bois among them, took place at this house.
57	Union Oyster House	Union Oyster House	May 27, 2003 (#03000645)	41-43 Union St. Downtown; 42°21′40″N 71°03′25″W	This is the oldest operating restaurant in the United States, opened in 1826. The building is at least 100 years older, dating roughly to the first decade of the 18th century.

== Historic areas of the NPS in Boston ==
National Historical Parks, some National Monuments, and certain other areas listed in the National Park system are historic landmarks of national importance that are highly protected already, often before the inauguration of the NHL program in 1960, and are then often not also named NHLs per se. There are two of these in Boston. The National Park Service lists these two together with the NHLs in the state,

They are:

	Landmark name	Image	Date established	Location	Description
1	Boston African American National Historic Site		October 10, 1980	Boston	The Park Service operates two buildings (the African Meeting House and the Abiel Smith School) of 15 locations that comprise this site. All of the site's locations are linked by the Black Heritage Trail, although only a few are open to the public.
2	Boston National Historical Park		October 1, 1974	Boston	The Park Service operates eight sites around Boston, most of which are on the Freedom Trail

== See also ==
- List of National Historic Landmarks in Massachusetts
- National Register of Historic Places listings in Boston, Massachusetts
