= Charles Sumner House =

Historic house in Boston, Massachusetts

- U.S. National Register of Historic Places
- U.S. National Historic Landmark
- U.S. National Historic Landmark District – Contributing property
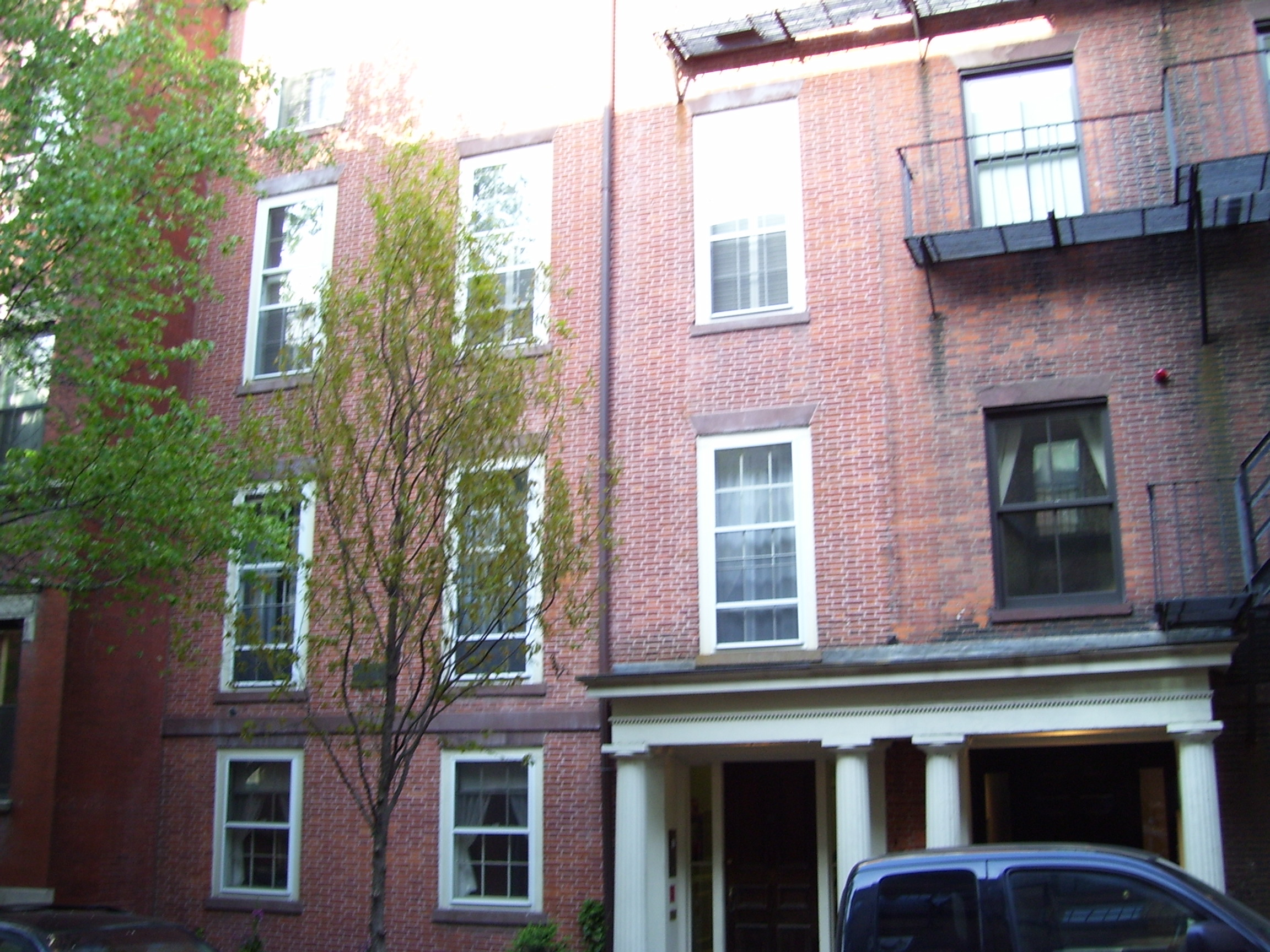

- Location within Boston Location within Massachusetts Location within the United States
- Location: 20 Hancock Street, Boston, Massachusetts
- Coordinates: 42°21′36″N 71°3′56″W
- Built: 1806
- Architectural style: Federal
- Part of: Beacon Hill Historic District (ID66000130)
- NRHP reference No.: 73001953

Significant dates
- Added to NRHP: November 7, 1973
- Designated NHL: November 7, 1973
- Designated NHLDCP: October 15, 1966

The Charles Sumner House is a historic house on Beacon Hill in Boston, Massachusetts. The brick townhouse, built c. 1806, is notable as the home for many years of Charles Sumner (1811–1874), an outspoken and aggressive political opponent of slavery, whose beating on the floor of the United States Senate in 1856 was a defining moment of the pre-American Civil War period. The house was designated a National Historic Landmark in 1973. He lived in the house from 1830 until 1867.

== Description and history ==
The Sumner House is a four-story townhouse, faced in brick, which was built c. 1806. The interior has a typical side hall plan, with a front parlor, behind which are a sitting room and kitchen. Its upper floors have similar arrangements of rooms. The house was Charles Sumner's home for thirty years.

Charles Sumner was born to abolitionist parents, and was educated at Harvard College, where he studied law under Joseph Story. Sumner became politically active in the fight against slavery in the 1840s, when he also gained a reputation as an orator. He helped found the abolitionist Free Soil Party in 1848, under whose banner he won election to the United States Senate in 1851. This marked the beginning of a more vocal and aggressive opposition to slavery in the political halls of Washington, D.C. His searing verbal reprobation of his opponents escalated into violence when he was beaten unconscious on the floor of the Senate by South Carolina Representative Preston Brooks in 1856, an event that emotionally polarized the country. After Sumner's recovery, he returned to the Senate, where he played a leading role as a Radical Republican during the American Civil War, as an advocate of emancipation. After the war he championed civil rights for free slaves during the Reconstruction Era, and played a role in the impeachment of President Andrew Johnson.

The house was designated a National Historic Landmark and listed on the National Register of Historic Places in 1973.

== Images ==
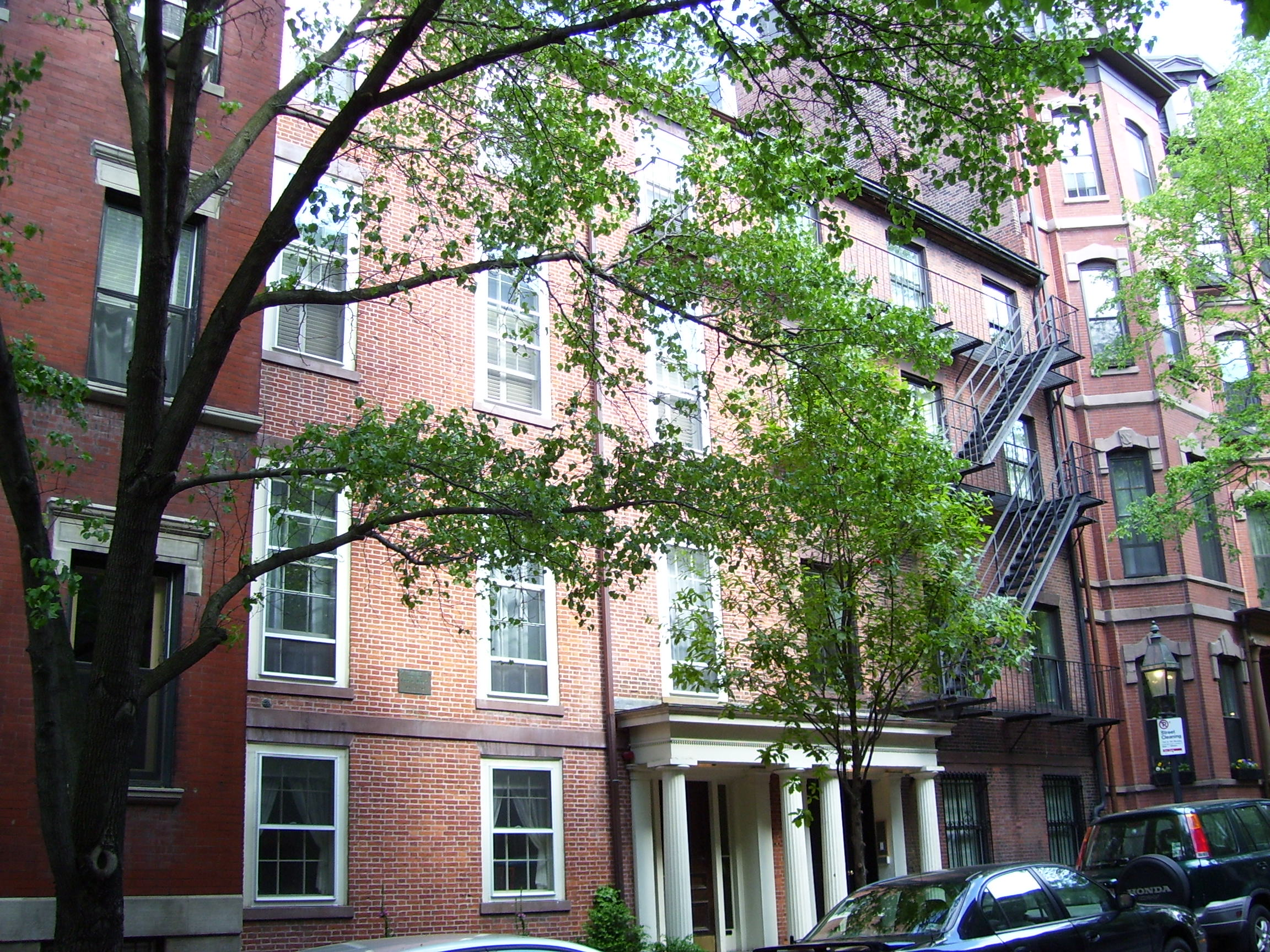
Sumner House

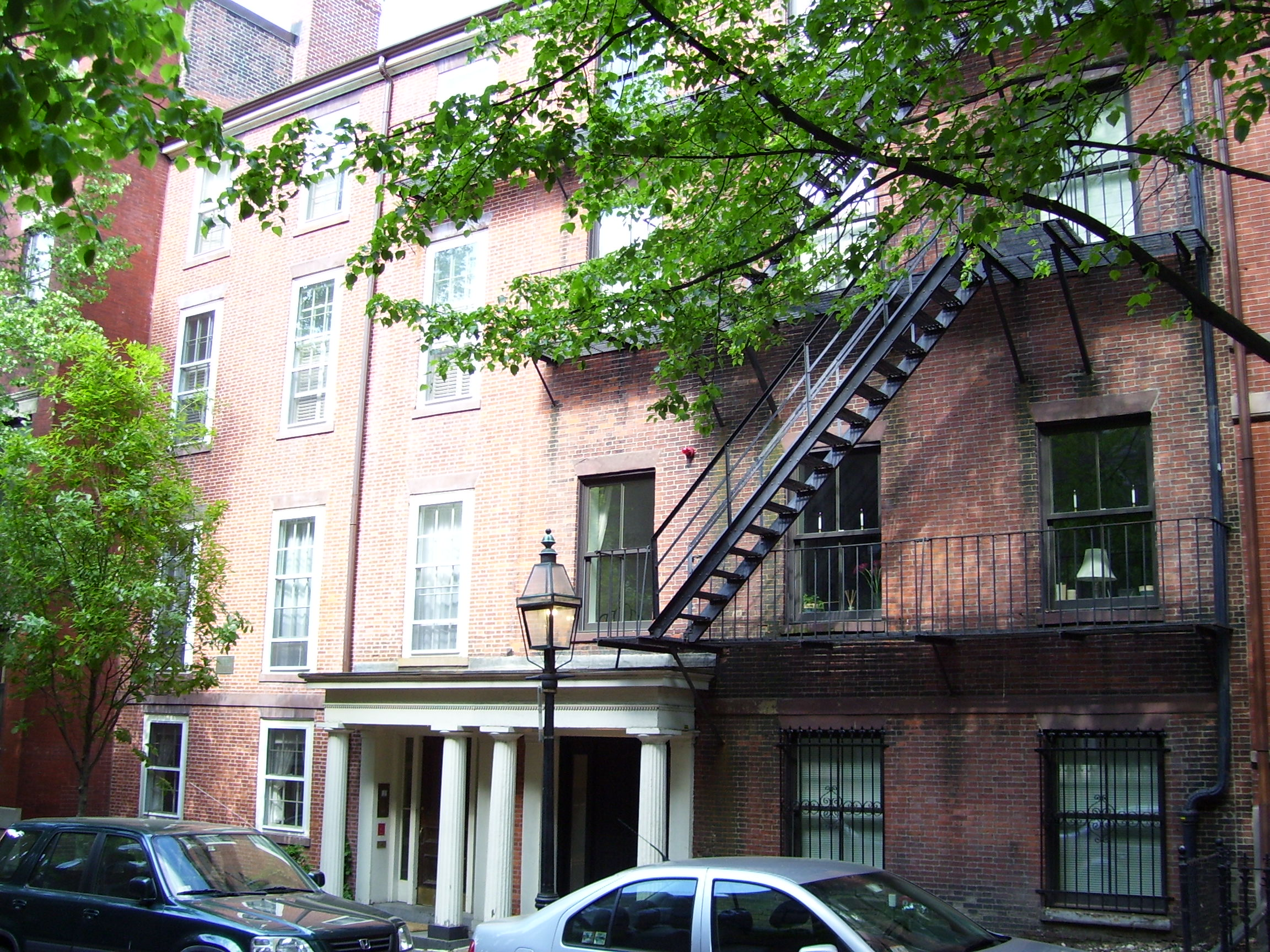
Sumner House

== See also ==
- List of National Historic Landmarks in Boston
- National Register of Historic Places listings in northern Boston, Massachusetts
