= Walter Young (minister) =

Scottish minister

- Church: Church of Scotland

Personal details
- Died: 1814 (aged 68–69)

Walter Young FRSE (1745 – 6 August 1814) was an 18th/19th century Scottish minister of the Church of Scotland remembered primarily as a musician and collector of Scottish songs. He was an influence on Robert Burns.

He made especial study of "luinigs" of the Western Isles: short, repetitive songs used for work tasks in the home.

== Life ==
He was born in Haddington in East Lothian in 1745, the son of David Young, rector of the local grammar school. His youngest sister Anne was a music teacher, who invented board games to help children learn music.

He was licensed to preach by the Church of Scotland in 1769 and ordained at Haddington. In 1771 he became minister of Erskine Parish Church.

He was a friend of John Ramsay of Ochtertyre and Rev Patrick MacDonald of Kilmore, and worked on song collecting together. Robert Burns consulted him at least once and several of the "Traditional" songs listed by Burns are probably sourced from Young.

In 1784 he was elected a Fellow of the Royal Society of Edinburgh. His proposers were Andrew Dalzell, William Robertson, and Alexander Carlyle.

He died in Erskine manse on 6 August 1814. He is buried in Old Erskine Parish churchyard, now on the B815. The grave is marked by an obelisk.

== Publications ==
- On the Influence of Poetry and Music Upon the Highlanders
