= USS Cassin Young =

Fletcher-class destroyer

USS Cassin Young (DD-793)
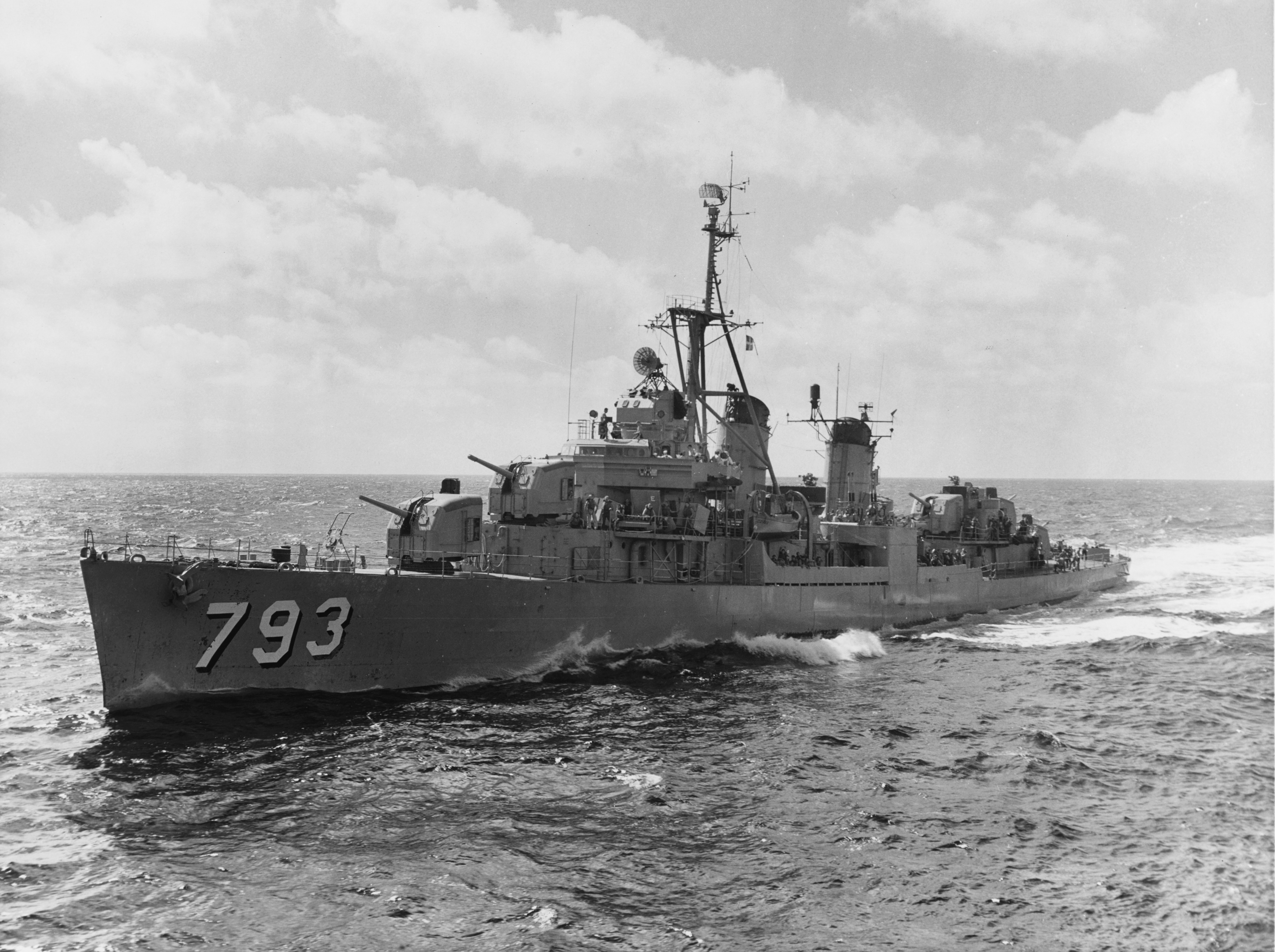
- USS Cassin Young underway on 14 January 1958

History

United States
- Name: Cassin Young
- Namesake: Cassin Young
- Builder: Bethlehem Shipbuilding
- Laid down: 18 March 1943
- Launched: 12 September 1943
- Sponsored by: Mrs. Eleanor Young
- Commissioned: 31 December 1943
- Decommissioned: 28 May 1946
- Recommissioned: 8 September 1951
- Decommissioned: 29 April 1960
- Stricken: 1 December 1974
- Identification: Callsign: NTTH; Hull number: DD-793
- Honours and awards: See Awards
- Status: Museum ship at the former Boston Navy Yard in Boston, Massachusetts.
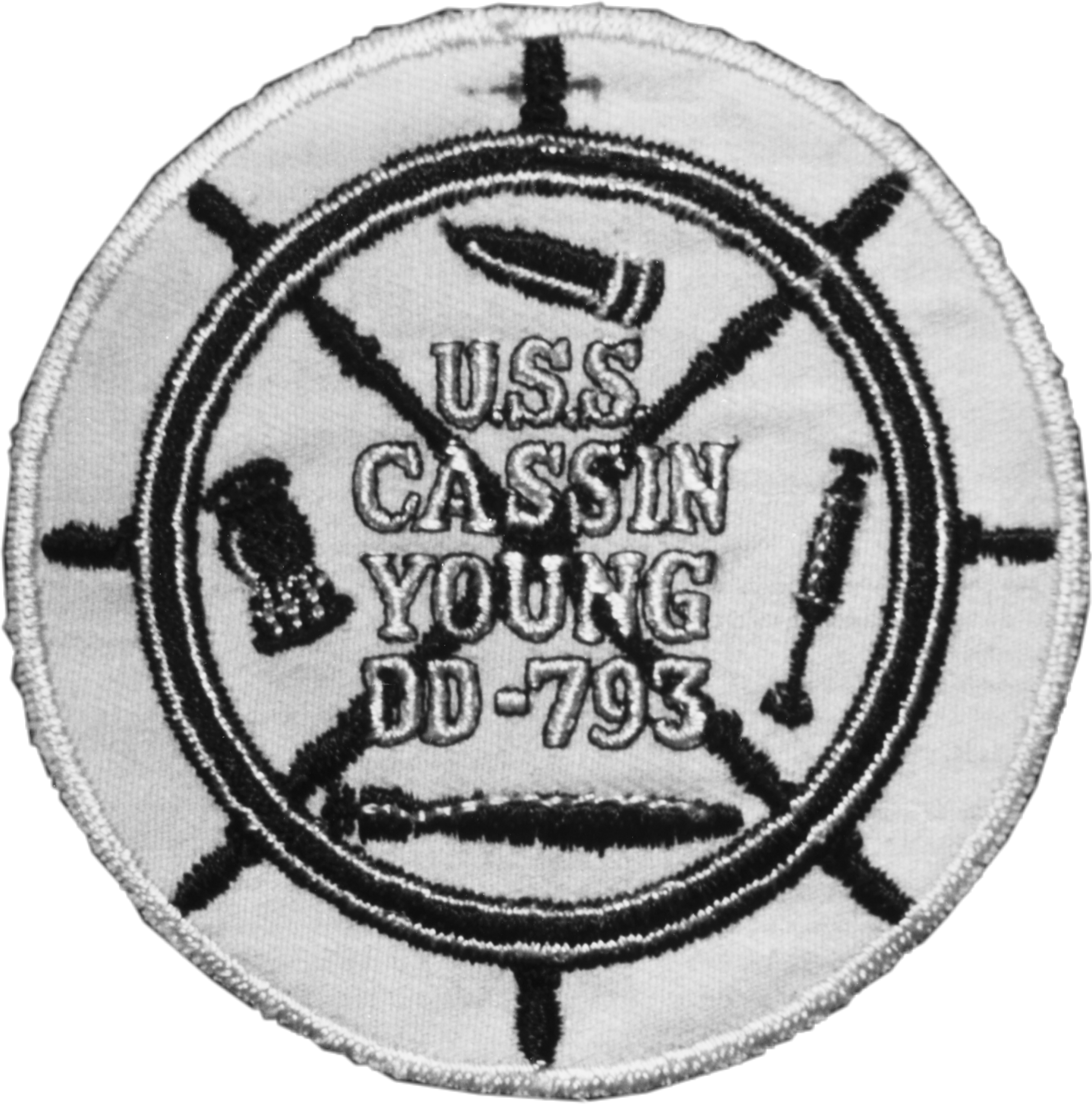
- Badge

General characteristics
- Class & type: Fletcher-class destroyer
- Displacement: 2,050 tons
- Length: 376.4 ft (114.7 m)
- Beam: 39.6 ft (12.1 m)
- Draft: 13.8 ft (4.2 m)
- Propulsion: 4 oil-fired boilers, 2 geared steam turbines, 2 shafts, 60,000 shp (45,000 kW)
- Speed: 36.5 knots (67.6 km/h; 42.0 mph)
- Range: 6,500 nmi (12,000 km; 7,500 mi) at 15 knots (28 km/h; 17 mph)
- Complement: 325
- Armament: (as built); 5 × 5 in (127 mm)/38 caliber guns; 5 × twin 40 mm AA guns; 7 × 20 mm AA guns; 2 × quintuple 21 inch (533 mm) torpedo tubes; 6 × K-gun depth charge throwers, 2 × depth charge tracks; (as preserved); 5 × 5 in (127 mm)/38 caliber guns, 2 × quad 40 mm AA guns; 1 × twin 40 mm AA guns; 1 × 20 mm AA gun; 1 × quintuple 21 in (533 mm) torpedo tubes; 2 × torpedo carriages for the Mark 32 torpedo, 2 × Hedgehog ASW mortar, 1 × depth charge track
- USS Cassin Young (destroyer)
- U.S. National Register of Historic Places
- U.S. National Historic Landmark
- U.S. Historic district – Contributing property
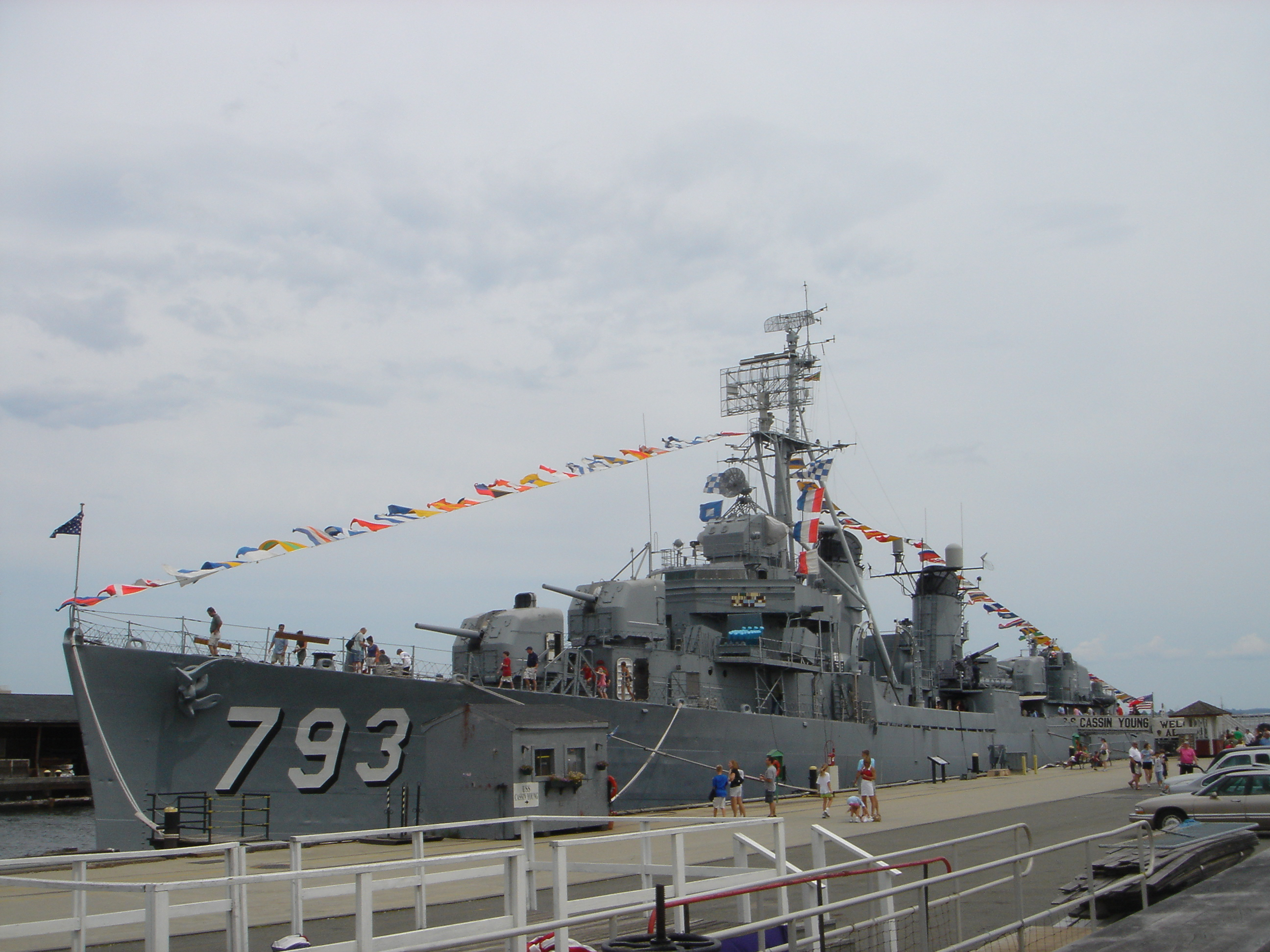

- Location within Boston Location within Massachusetts
- Location: Charlestown Navy Yard, Boston, Massachusetts
- Coordinates: 42°22′20″N 71°03′16″W
- Built: 1943
- Architect: Bethlehem Steel Corp.
- Part of: Boston National Historical Park (ID74002222)
- NRHP reference No.: 86000084

Significant dates
- Added to NRHP: 14 January 1986
- Designated CP: 26 October 1974

USS Cassin Young (DD-793) is a Fletcher-class destroyer of the United States Navy named for Captain Cassin Young (1894–1942), who was awarded the Medal of Honor for his heroism at the Japanese attack on Pearl Harbor and killed in the Naval Battle of Guadalcanal in the fall of 1942.

Cassin Young (DD-793) was launched 12 September 1943 by Bethlehem Shipbuilding, San Pedro, Los Angeles; sponsored by Mrs. Eleanor Young; and commissioned on 31 December 1943.

After serving in World War II, including the Battle of Leyte Gulf and the Battle of Okinawa, Cassin Young was decommissioned, but was reactivated during the Korean War and continued in active service until 1960. She is preserved today as a memorial ship, berthed at Boston Navy Yard (within Boston National Historical Park) in Massachusetts, across from the USS Constitution. She was designated a National Historic Landmark in 1986 as one of only four surviving Fletcher-class destroyers still afloat. The USS Cassin Young can now be visited seasonally free of charge at Boston Navy Yard.

== Service history ==
=== 1944 ===
Cassin Young arrived at Pearl Harbor 19 March 1944 to complete her training before sailing on to Manus, where she joined the massive Fast Carrier Task Force (then called TF 58, at other times called TF 38, depending on whether the overall organization was called 5th Fleet or 3rd Fleet). On 28 April, this force sortied for air attacks on Japanese strongholds at Truk, Woleai, Satawan, and Ponape, during which Cassin Young operated as a picket ship, assigned to warn her group of possible enemy counterattack.

She returned to Majuro, and then Pearl Harbor for further training before reporting to Eniwetok on 11 June to join the screen of escort carriers assigned to covering duty in the invasion of Saipan four days later. In addition to radar picket and screening duty, she was also called upon for inshore fire support. As the battle for Saipan raged ashore, escort carriers of Cassin Young's group launched attacks on the island, as well as sorties to neutralize enemy air fields on Tinian, Rota, and Guam. Similar operations supporting the subsequent assaults on Tinian and Guam claimed the services of Cassin Young until 13 August, when she returned to Eniwetok to replenish.

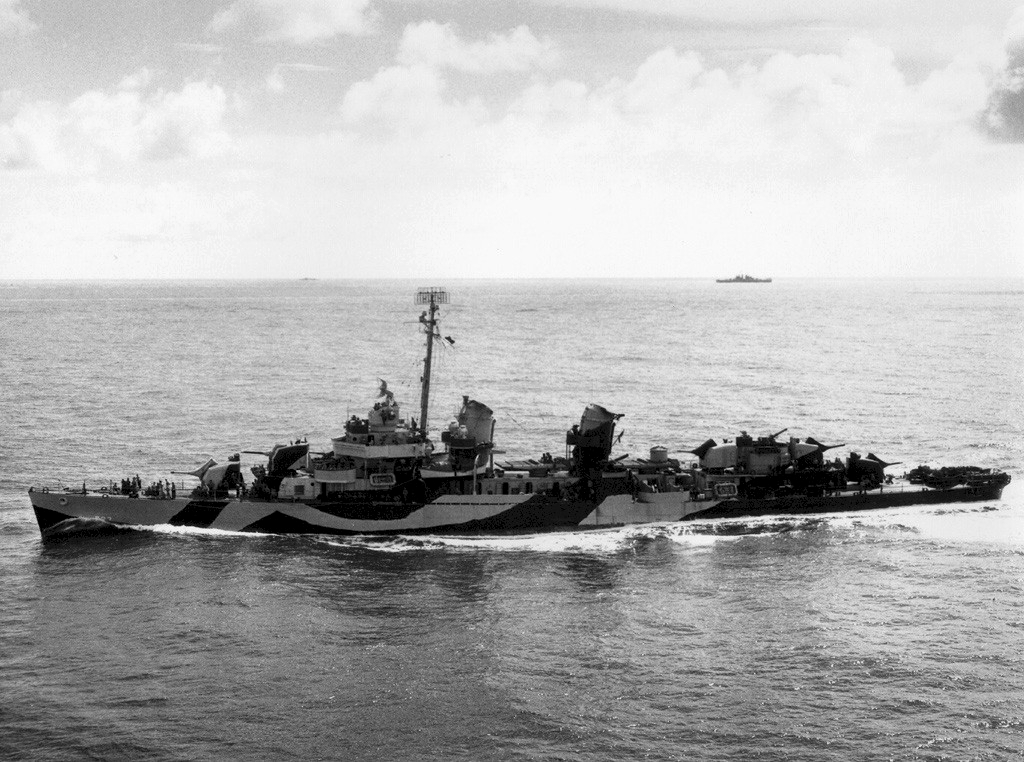
Cassin Young in 1944

Between 29 August and 2 October 1944, Cassin Young guarded the carriers of Task Group 38.3 as strikes were flown from their decks to hit targets on Palau, Mindanao, and Luzon in support of the assault on the Palaus, stepping-stone to the Philippines. Only four days after her return from this mission to Ulithi, Cassin Young sailed on 6 October with the same force on duty in the accelerated schedule for the Philippines assault. First on the schedule were air strikes on Okinawa, Luzon, and Formosa; these led to the furious Formosa Air Battle of 10 to 13 October, during which the Japanese tried to destroy the carrier strength of the imposing TF 38. On 14 October, the cruiser Reno was struck by a kamikaze, which wounded five of Cassin Young's men with machine gun fire. Cassin Young aided in shooting down several aircraft in this attack.

On 18 October 1944, TF 38 took position east of Luzon to launch strikes immobilizing enemy air fields there in preparation for the assault on Leyte two days later. After standing by to render support if called upon during the initial landings, Cassin Young's group began to search for the enemy forces known to be moving toward Leyte Gulf on 23 October, and next day moved in toward San Bernardino Strait, ready to launch strikes. In the most vigorous and successful air attack mounted by the Japanese during the Leyte operation, at 09:38 on 24 October, an enemy bomb struck the aircraft carrier Princeton, and Cassin Young rejoined TG 38.3 for the dash northward to attack the Japanese Northern Force. This developed on 25 October into the Battle off Cape Engaño, a series of air strikes in which four Japanese carriers and a destroyer were sunk.

=== 1945 ===
Cassin Young continued operations in support of the Leyte conquest, as her carriers continued to range widely, striking at enemy bases on Okinawa, Formosa, and Luzon. With Ulithi as her base, the destroyer screened carriers during the January 1945 South China Sea raid as their aircraft pounded away at Formosa, Luzon, Camranh Bay, Hong Kong, Canton, and the Nansei Shoto in their support for the assault on Luzon. A brief overhaul at Ulithi prepared her for the operations supporting the invasion of Iwo Jima with air strikes on Honshu and Okinawa, the bombardment of Parece Vela, and screening off Iwo Jima itself during the initial assault on 19 February.

==== Okinawa ====
Cassin Young returned to Ulithi, where she was attached to Task Force 54 (TF 54) for the invasion of Okinawa, for which she sailed from Ulithi 22 March 1945. After screening heavy ships in the massive pre-invasion bombardment, Cassin Young moved inshore to support the activities of underwater demolition teams preparing the beaches. On invasion day itself, 1 April, the destroyer offered fire support in the assault areas, then took up radar picket duty. As the Japanese air arm had been decimated by this point in the war, the lack of trained and experienced pilots led to its most extensive deployment of kamikaze attacks during this battle; on 6 April, Cassin Young experienced her first kamikaze action, rescuing the survivors of two nearby destroyers that were sunk.

===== 12 April Kamikaze damage =====
On 12 April, a massive wave of kamikazes came in at midday. Cassin Young's accurate gunfire had aided in shooting down five aircraft, but a sixth crashed high-up into her foremast, exploding in midair only 50 feet (15 m) from the ship. Surprisingly only one man was killed, TM3cT Robert Dean "Bobby" Moore, 19, of Enid, Oklahoma. 58 were wounded, many seriously. Cassin Young, although damaged, made it to Kerama Retto under her own power. After repairs there and at Ulithi, she returned to Okinawa on 31 May, and resumed radar picket duty.

===== 30 July Kamikaze strike =====
As the kamikaze attacks continued, Cassin Young had respite only during two brief convoy escort voyages to the Marianas. On 28 July, her group was again a prime target for the Japanese, with one destroyer sunk and another badly damaged by kamikazes. During the engagement, Cassin Young assisted in shooting down two enemy aircraft, and rescued survivors from the sunken ship. At 0200 30 July, she was struck for the second time, when a low-flying aircraft hit her starboard side, striking her fire control room. A tremendous explosion amidships was followed by fire, but the crew managed to restore power to one engine, get the flames under control, and had the ship underway for the safety of Kerama Retto within 20 minutes. Twenty-two men were killed and 45 wounded. For her determined service and gallantry in the Okinawa radar picket line she was awarded the Navy Unit Commendation.

=== 1946 ===
Cassin Young cleared Okinawa 8 August and headed home for repairs. Arriving home in San Pedro, California she was fully repaired, and then decommissioned and placed in reserve in San Diego on 28 May 1946.

=== 1951–1960 ===
Recommissioned 8 September 1951, she cleared San Diego on 4 January 1952 for her new home port, Newport, Rhode Island. In September 1952 she entered Dry Dock 1 at Boston Navy Yard for the first of four major overhauls she would undergo in this shipyard. At this time the ship was updated to its current configuration. Two Hedgehog anti-submarine (ASW) launchers and two torpedo carriages for the Mark 32 torpedo were added, with one 21 inch (533 mm) quintuple torpedo tube mount removed. Also, four 40 mm Bofors twin mounts were replaced by two quadruple mounts. The forward pole mast was replaced by a tripod mast to accommodate improved radar and electronics systems. Local operations and refresher training in the Caribbean preceded a period of antisubmarine exercises off Florida from 7 May to 12 June 1953. Her first tour of duty with the 6th Fleet in the Mediterranean took place from 16 September to 30 November 1953. After another period of local operations, and exercises in the Caribbean Sea early in 1954, she cleared Newport on 3 May for a round-the-world cruise, which included exercises with the 7th Fleet in the western Pacific, patrols off Korea, and good-will visits to Far Eastern and Mediterranean ports. She returned to Newport on 28 November 1954. Her operations from that time until 1960 included training exercises in the Caribbean and off the eastern seaboard as well as tours of duty in the Mediterranean in 1956, winter 1956–57, and 1959, and a round of visits to ports of northern Europe in 1958. During that last overseas deployment an issue was discovered with her rudder that put her into dry dock in France. At that point the repair costs outweighed retaining the aging ship. Consequently, on 6 February 1960 she arrived at Norfolk Naval Shipyard to be decommissioned. The ship was put into long-term storage at the Philadelphia Naval Inactive Ship Maintenance Facility 29 April 1960.

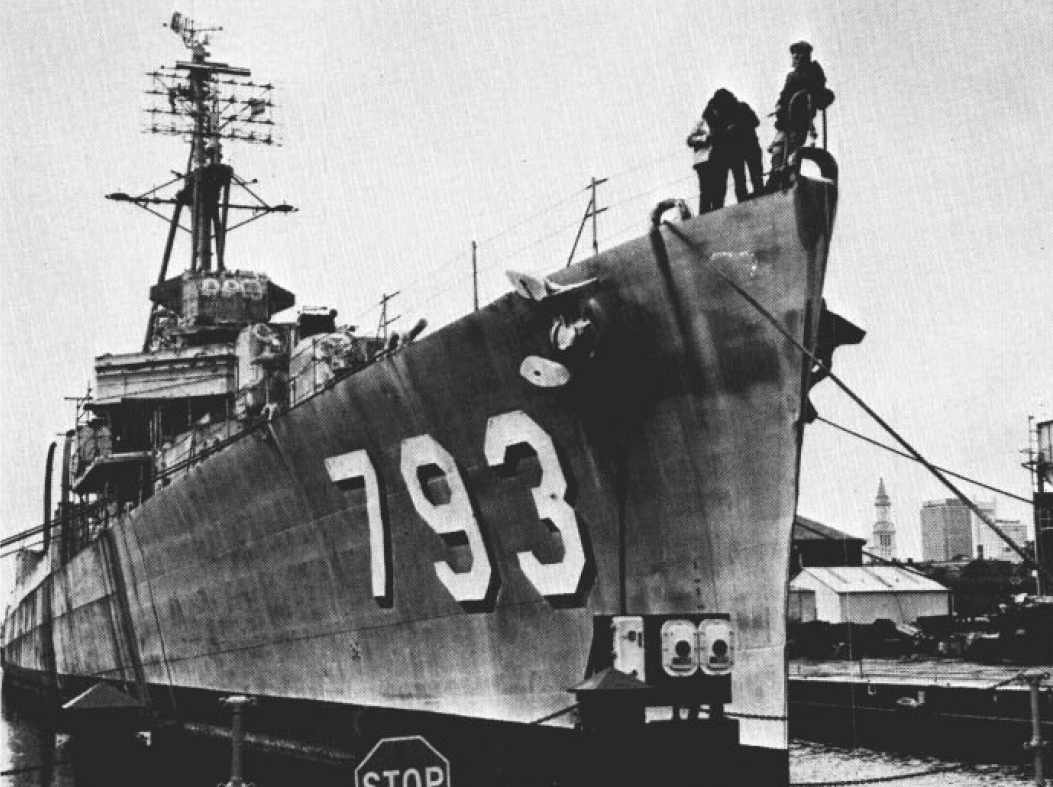
Cassin Young arriving in Boston, 1978

=== 1974–present ===
Cassin Young was struck from the Naval Vessel Register on 1 December 1974. The US Navy has permanently loaned Cassin Young to the National Park Service as a floating memorial ship, berthed at Boston Navy Yard within the Boston National Historical Park in Boston, Massachusetts, across from Constitution. She arrived on 15 June 1978 and was opened to the public in 1981. The ship is maintained and operated by the National Park Service and Cassin Young Volunteers. She was listed on the National Register of Historic Places and designated a National Historic Landmark in 1986, as a well-preserved example of the Fletcher-class destroyer, the most numerous class of destroyer produced by the United States during World War II.

In late July 2010, Cassin Young closed to the public in preparation for dry-docking. On 9 August 2010, she was moved into Historic Dry Dock #1 at Boston Navy Yard for the first time in 30 years for some much needed repairs to her hull. On 4 September 2012, the ship was closed to the public to allow contractors to make final repairs to the hull. She returned to her position at Pier 1 on 14 May 2013. On 4 June 2013, she was moved to the Boston Harbor Shipyard and Marina in East Boston while repairs were made to her berth in Charlestown. By September 2013, she had returned to her museum berth. In 2026, it was announced that a 3D virtual tour of the ship would be available on the website of the park where it resided.

Three other Fletcher-class ships are preserved as memorials:

- USS The Sullivans (DD-537) at Buffalo, New York
- USS Kidd (DD-661) at Baton Rouge, Louisiana
- Greek destroyer Velos (D16), former USS Charrette (DD-581), at Thessaloniki, Greece

== Awards ==
- Navy Unit Commendation
- Asiatic–Pacific Campaign Medal with seven battle stars
- World War II Victory Medal
- Navy Occupation Medal with "EUROPE" clasp
- China Service Medal
- National Defense Service Medal
- Korean Service Medal
- Philippine Presidential Unit Citation
- Korean Presidential Unit Citation
- Philippine Liberation Medal with two stars
- United Nations Service Medal
- Korean War Service Medal

== Gallery ==
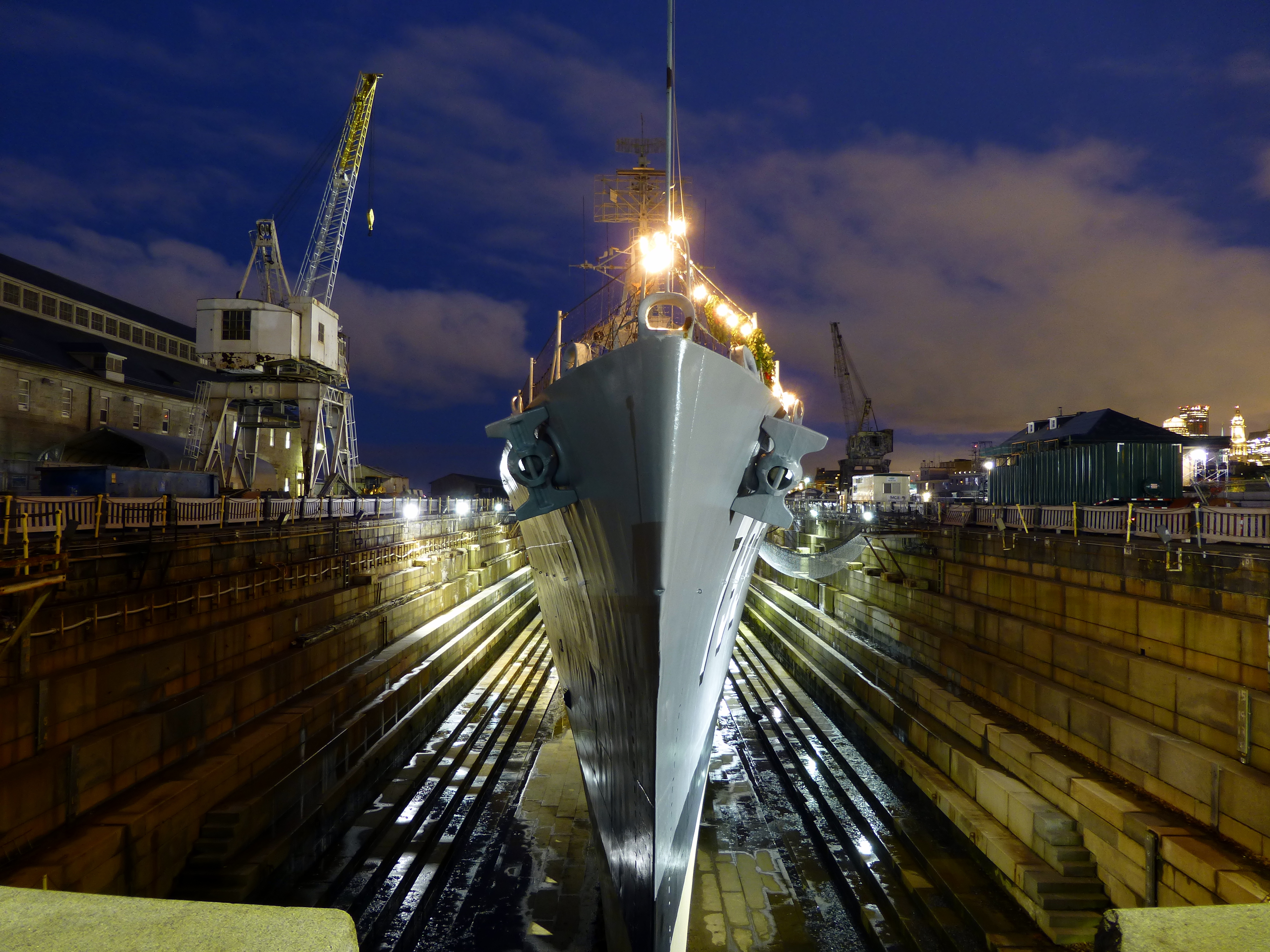
In dry dock December 2012

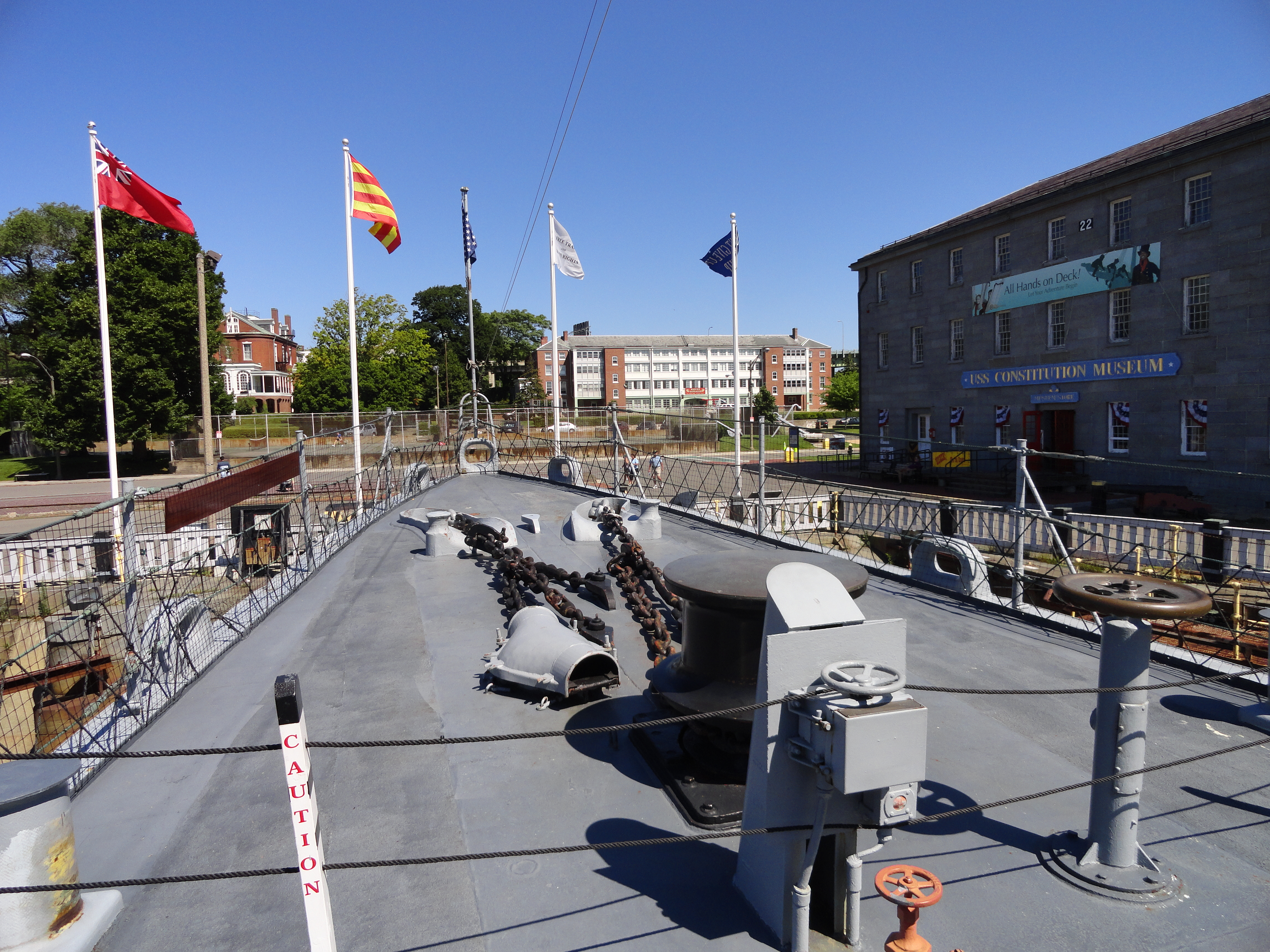
Bow with anchors aweigh

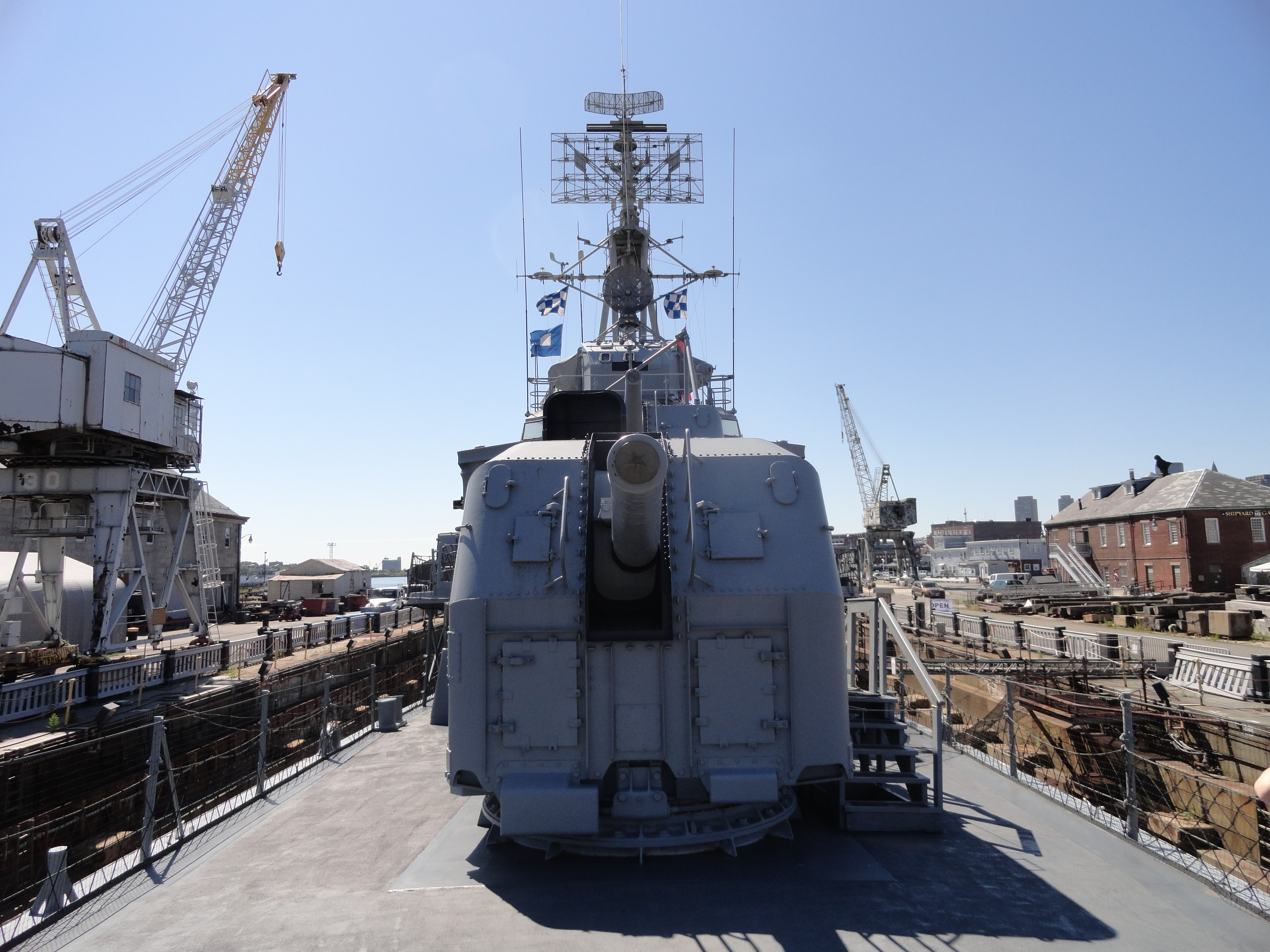
"Battery 51" (most forward 5"/38 gun turret)

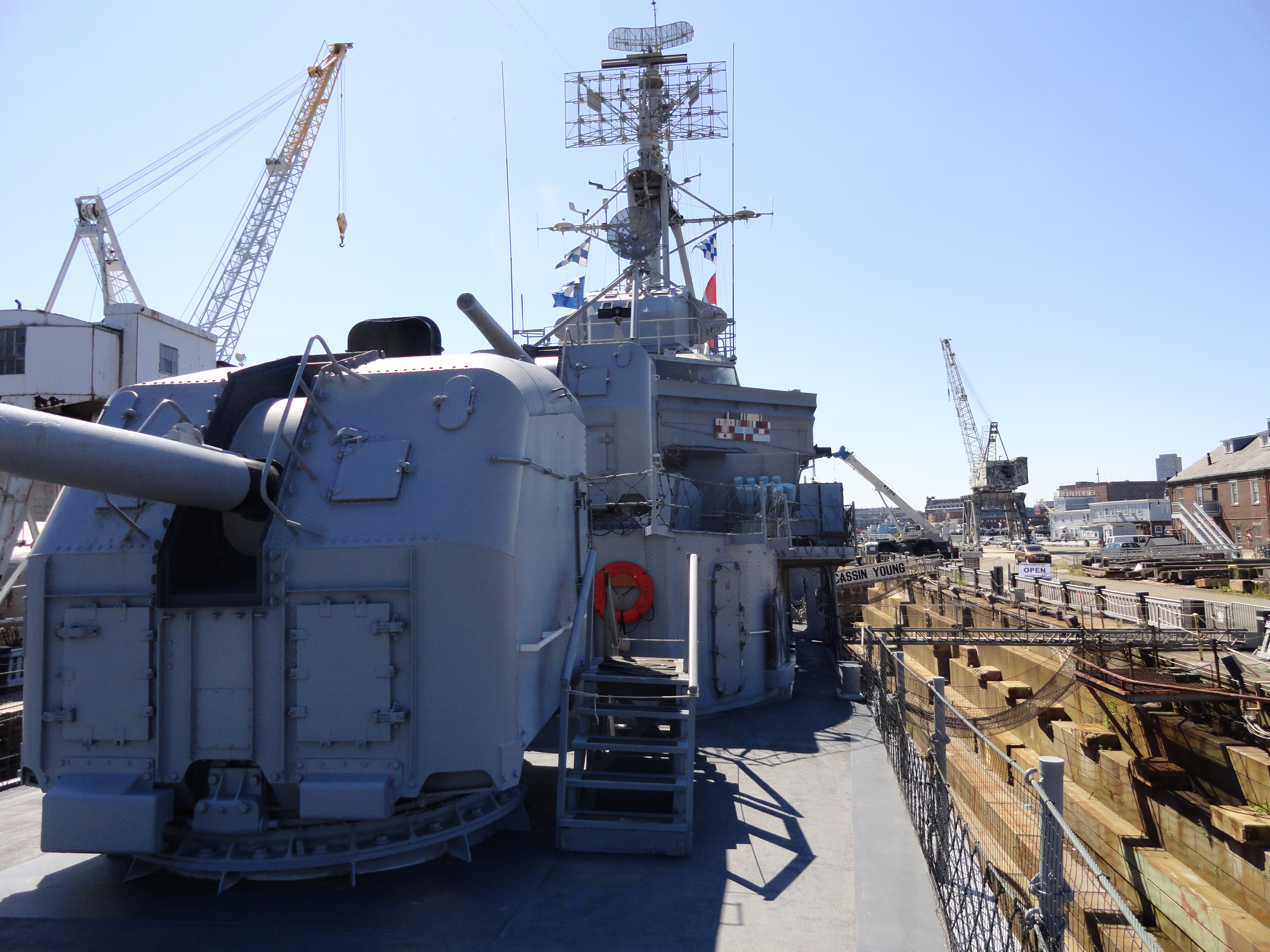
Batteries "51" and "52" (Note Mk 25 fire control radar atop turret)

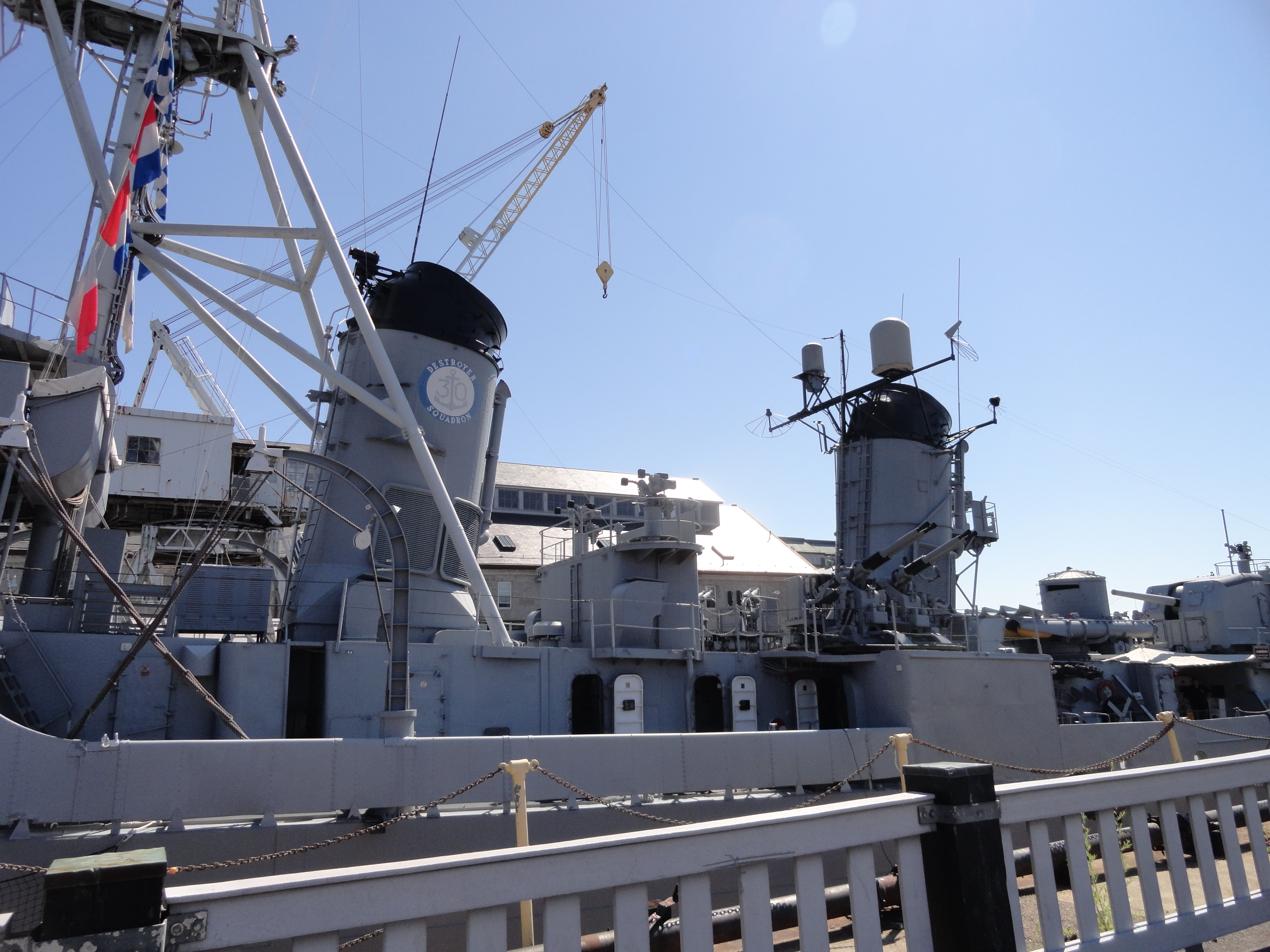
DESRON 30 emblem on forward stack; note torpedoes aft of AA guns

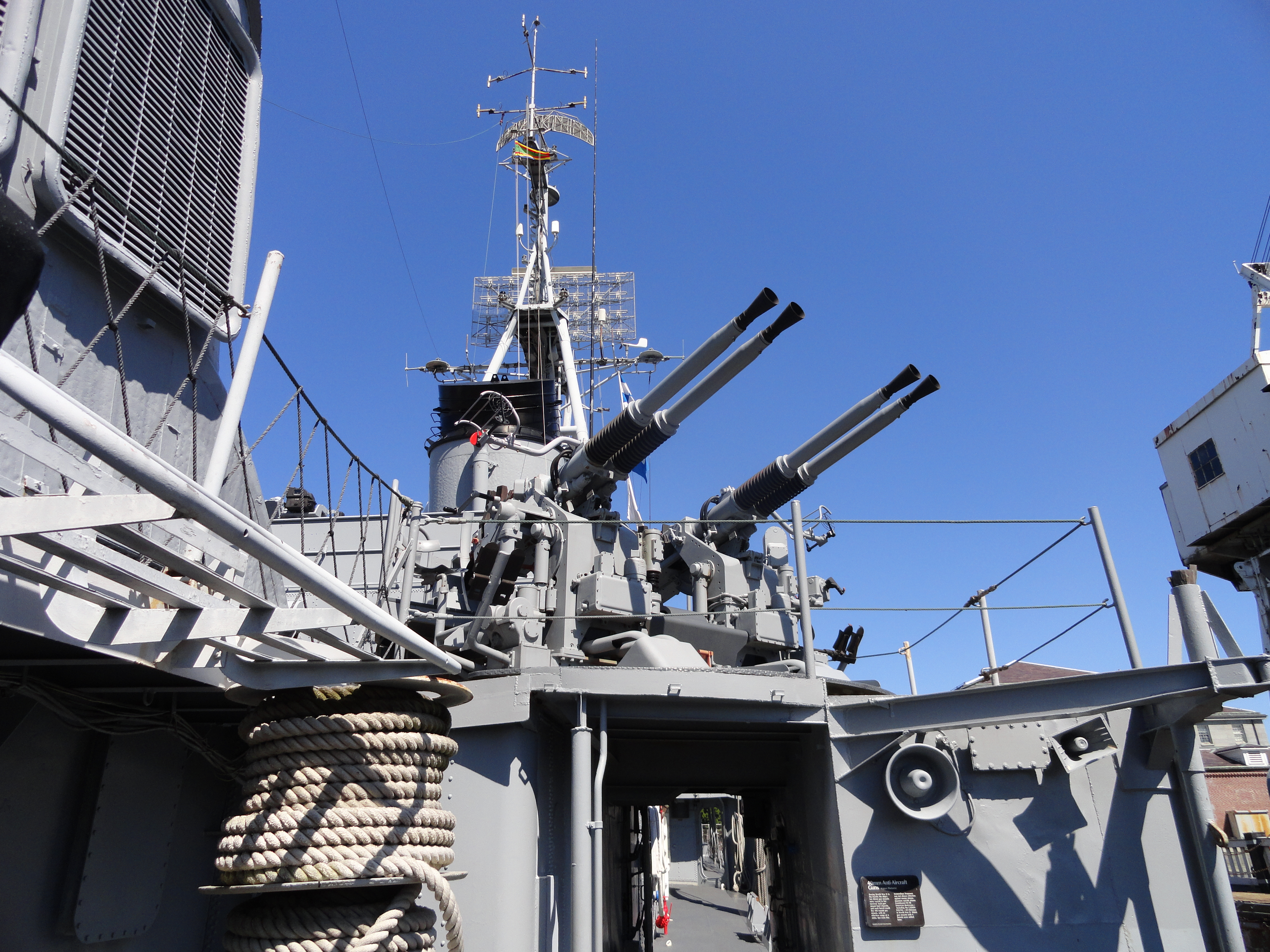
40 mm Bofors AA guns

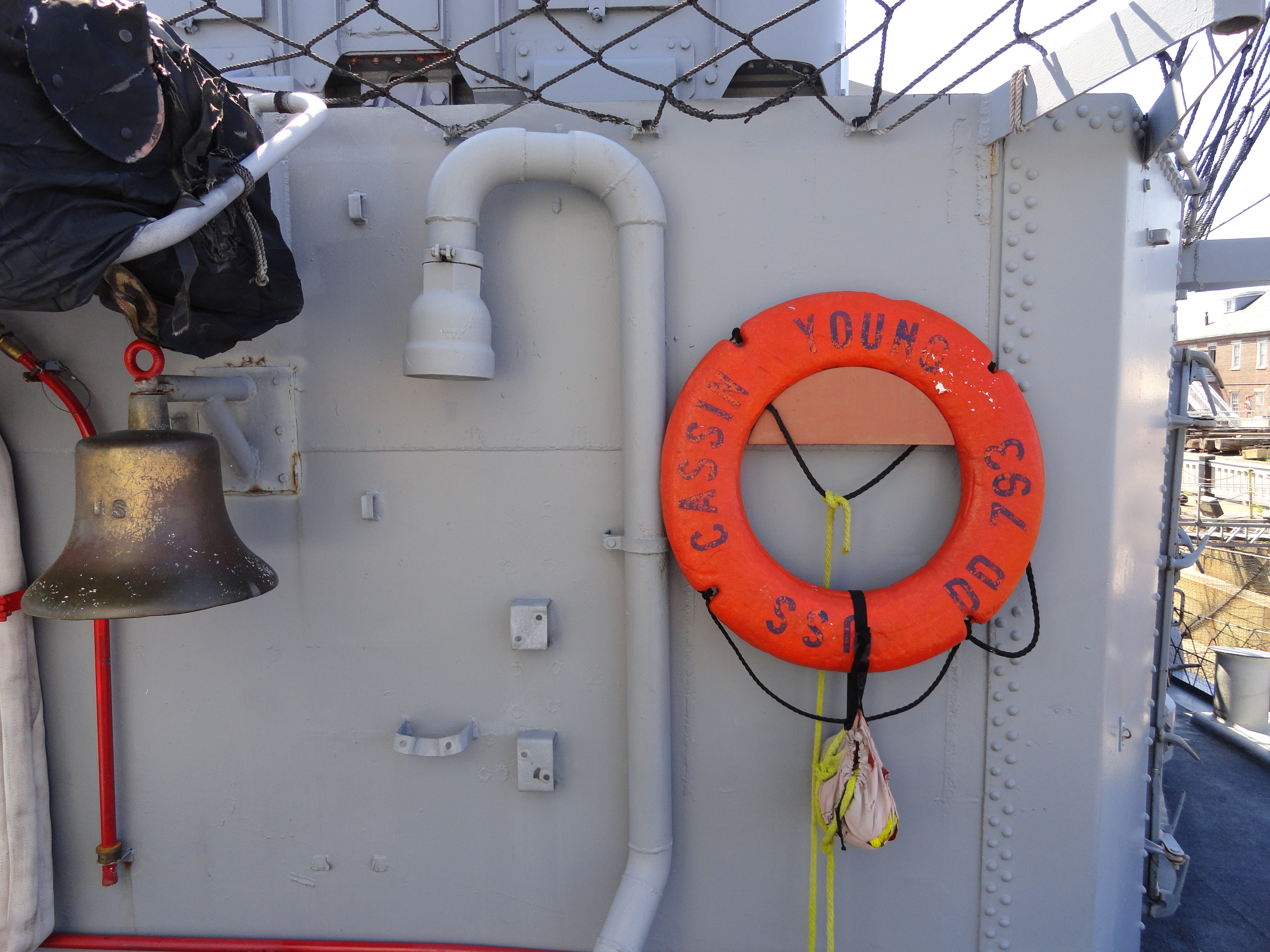
Bell and lifebuoy

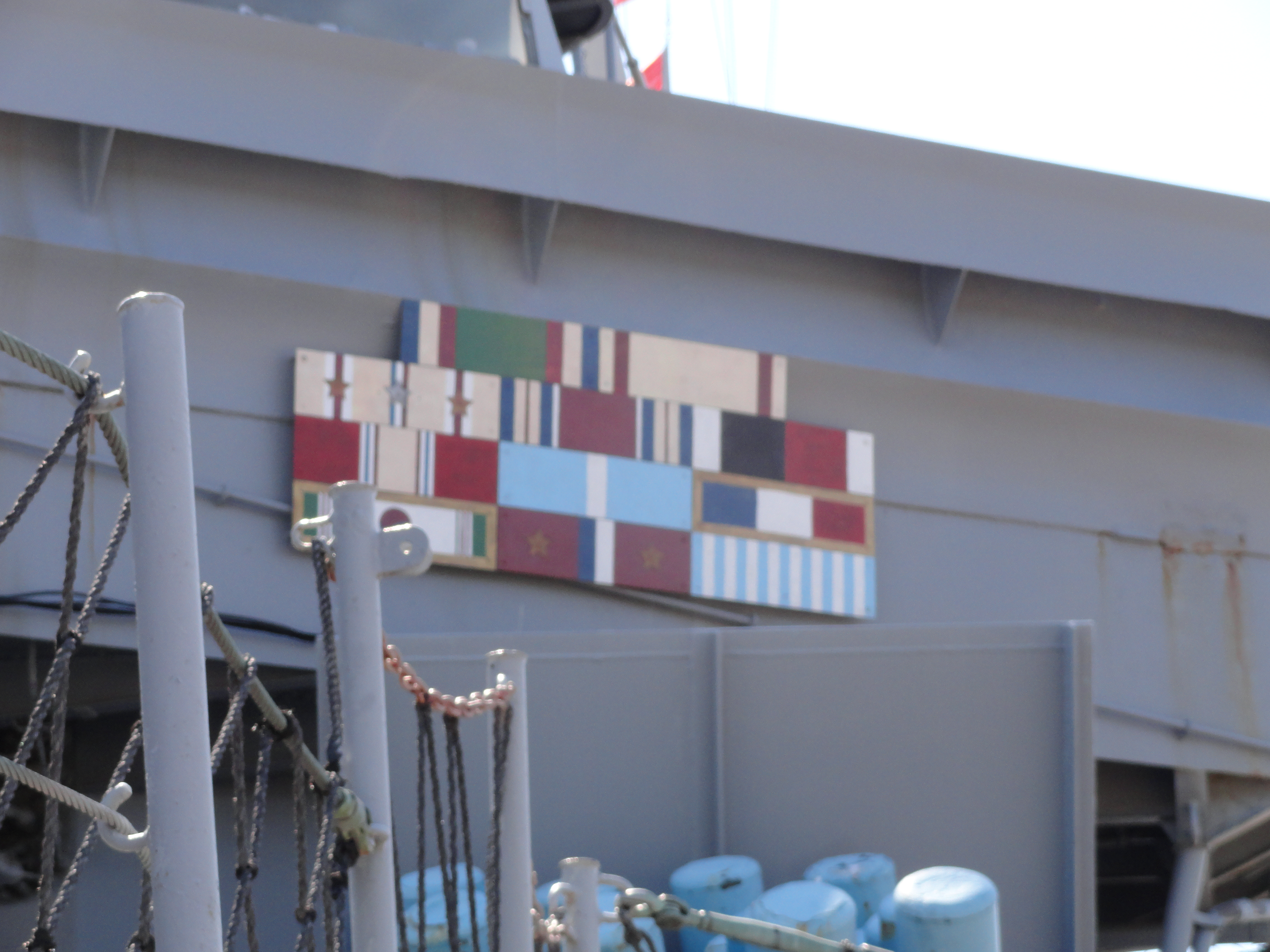
Awards

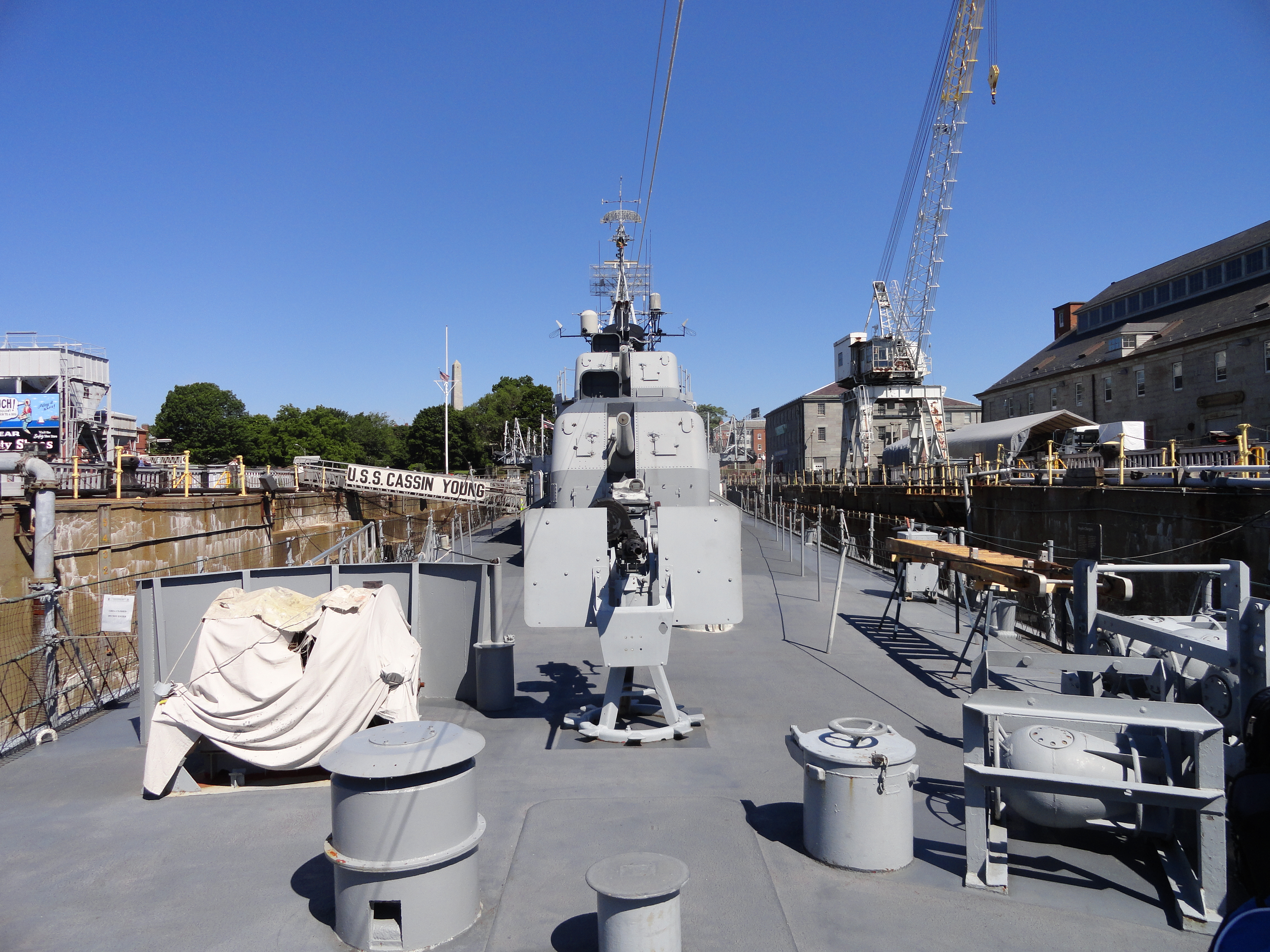
Batteries "54" and "55" (aft most 5"/38 gun turret)

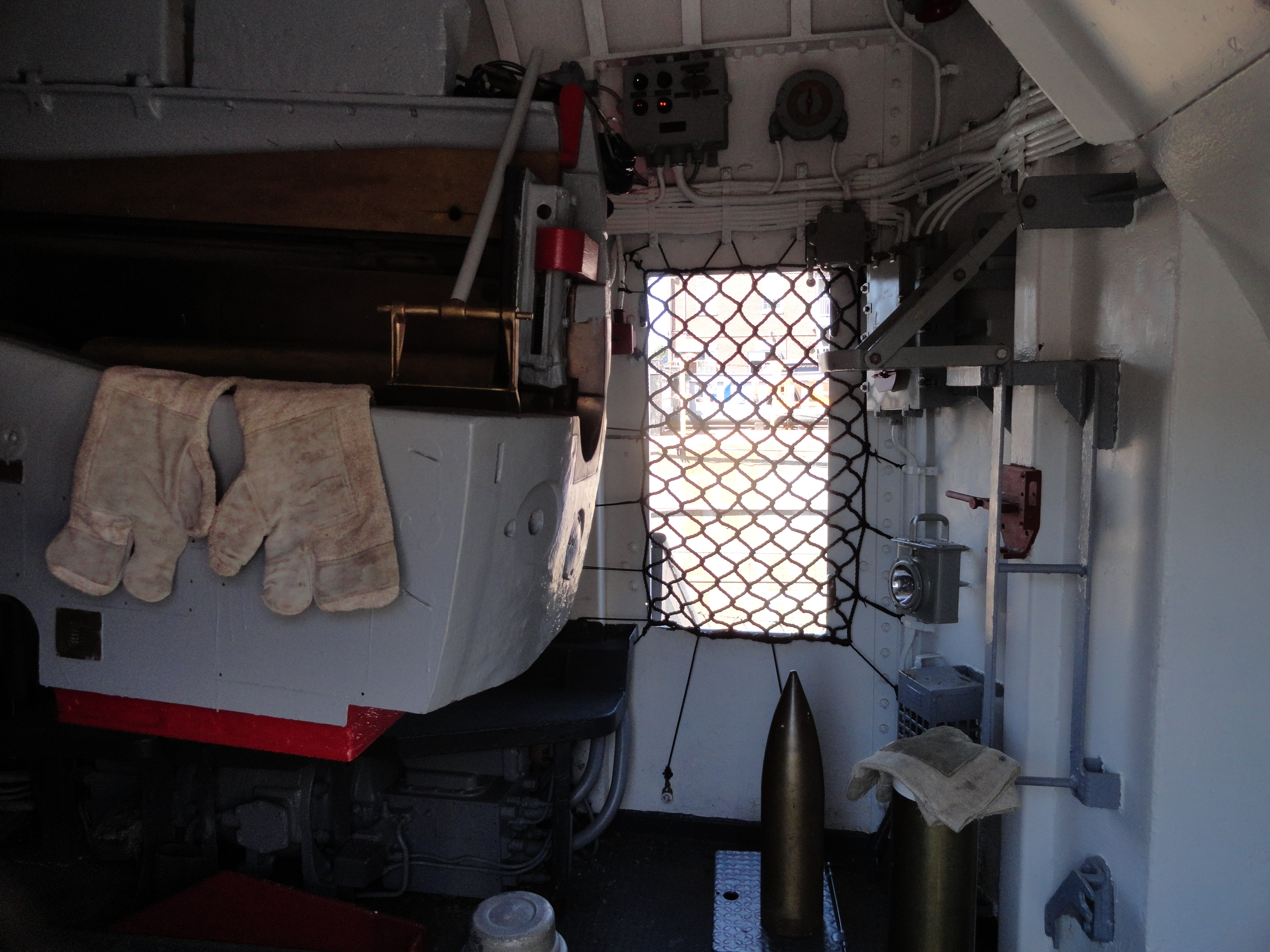
Inside a Mark 12 5"/38 caliber gun turret

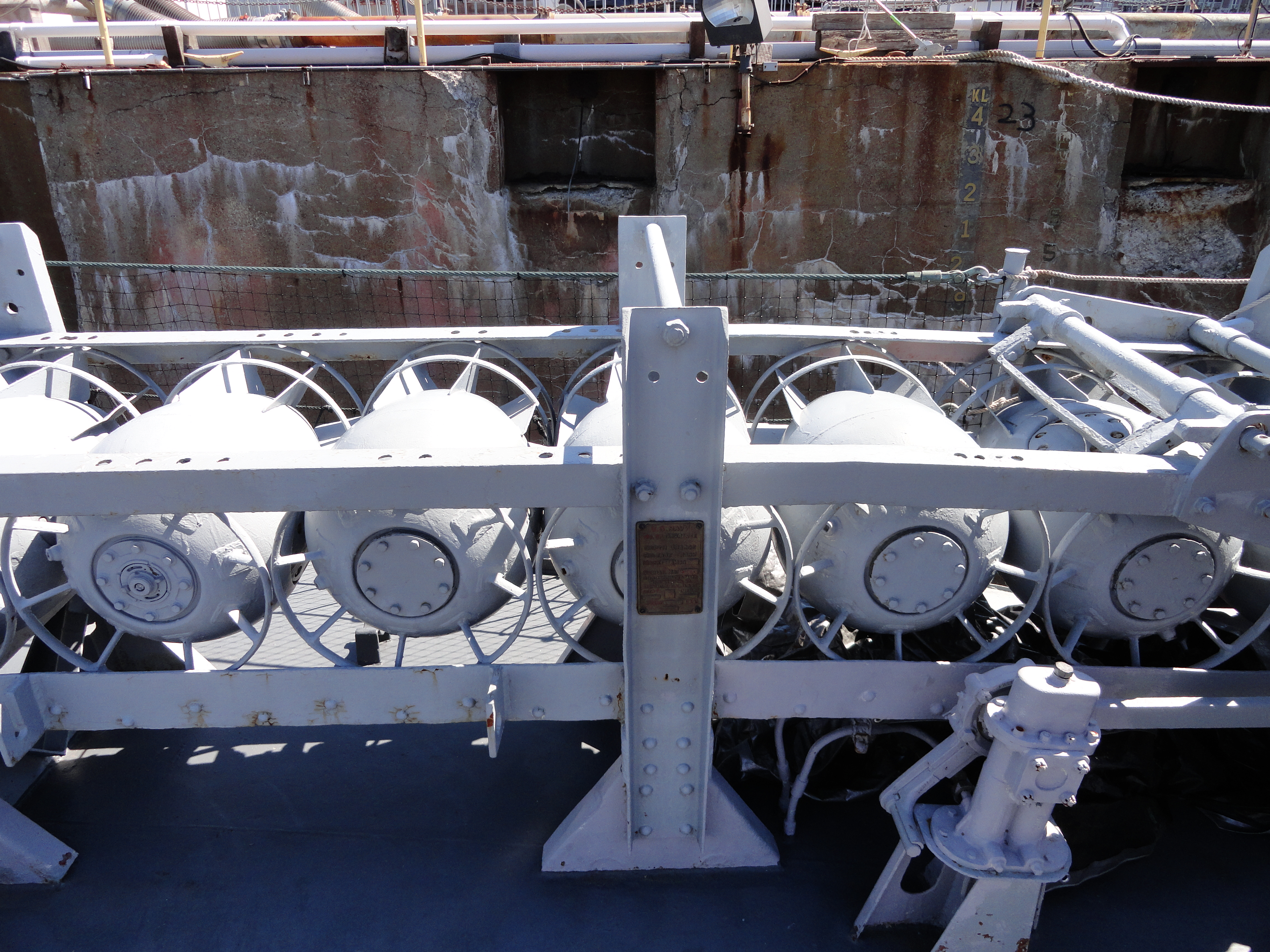
Depth charges

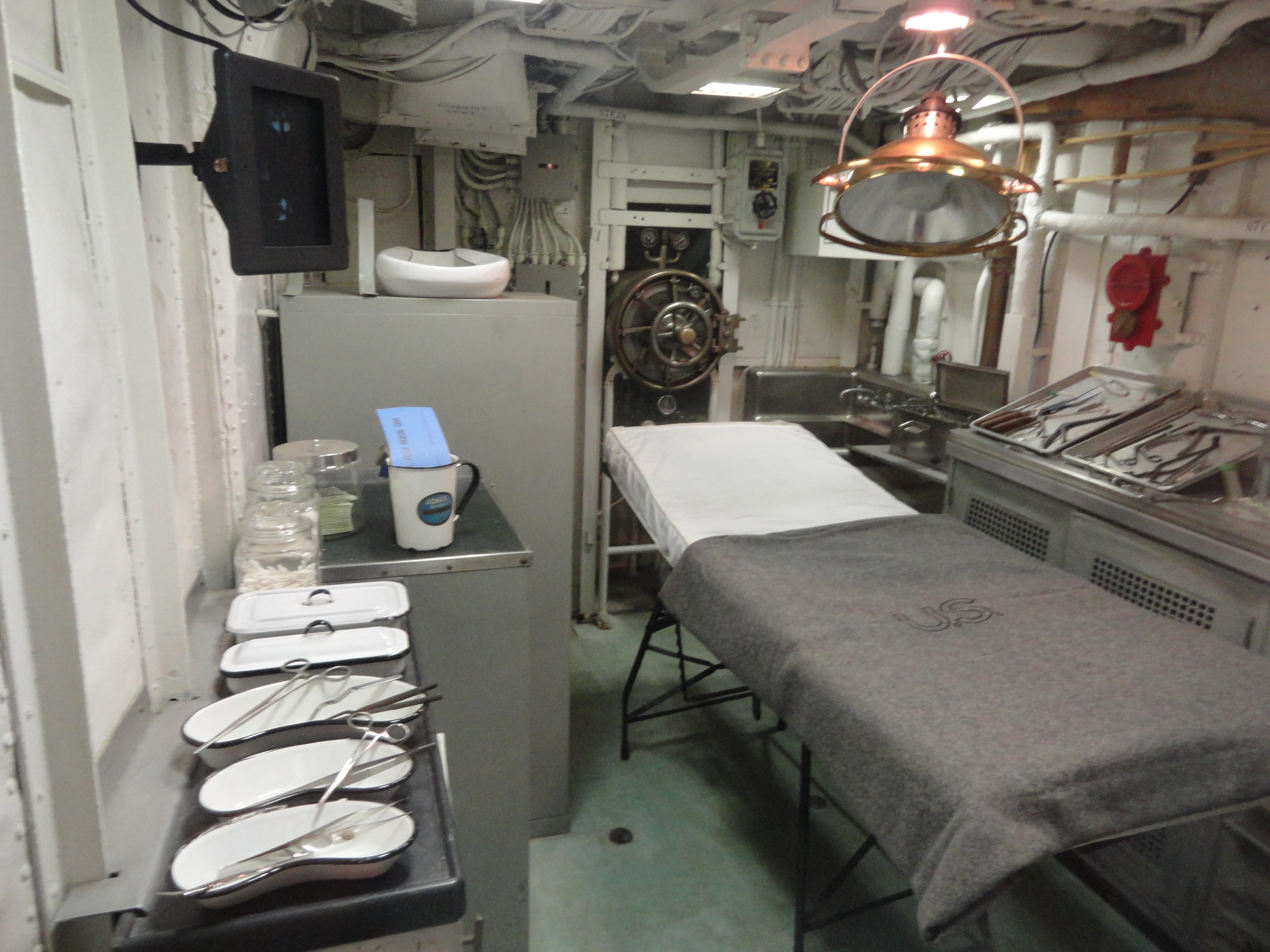
Operating room

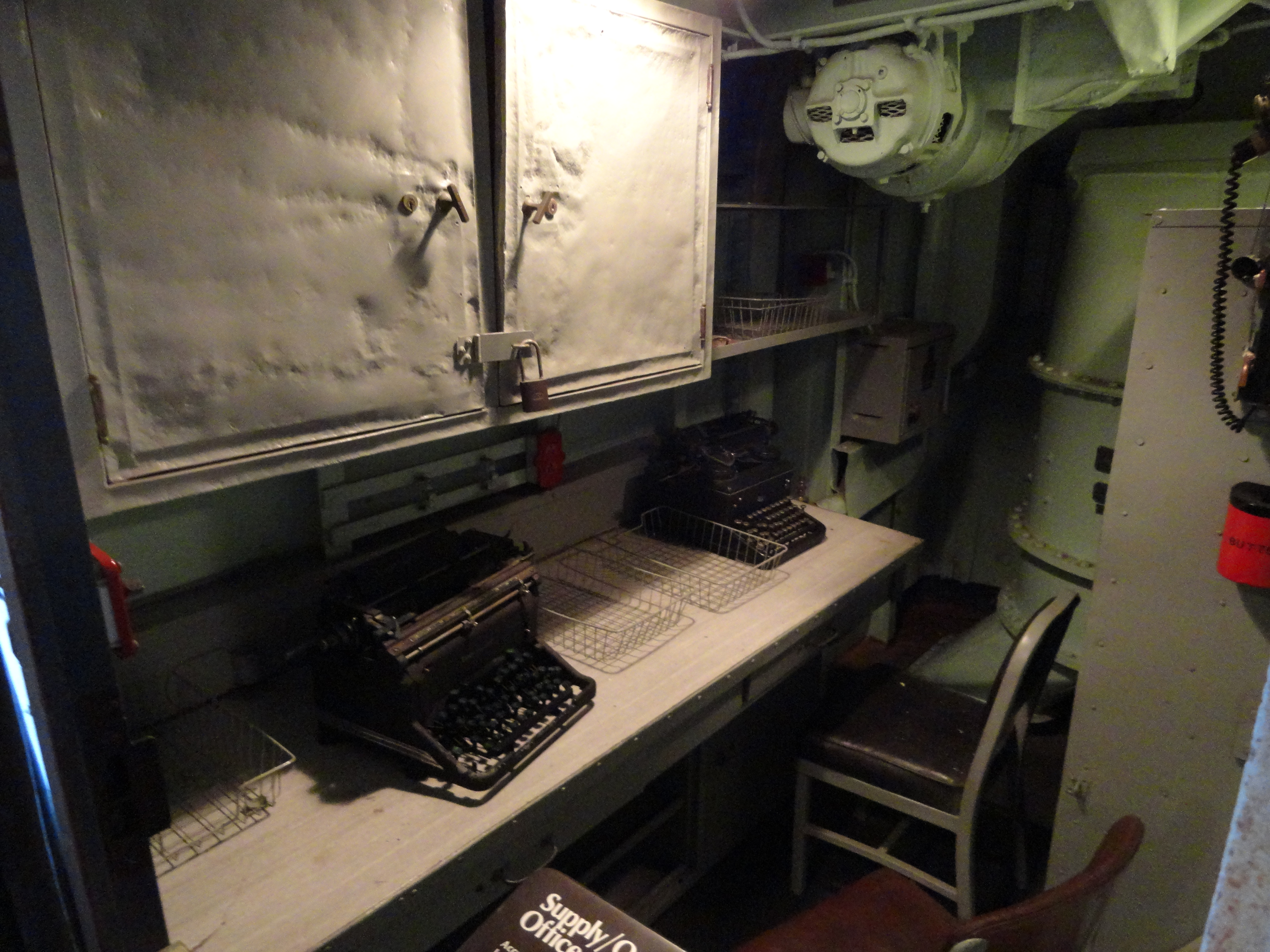
Office

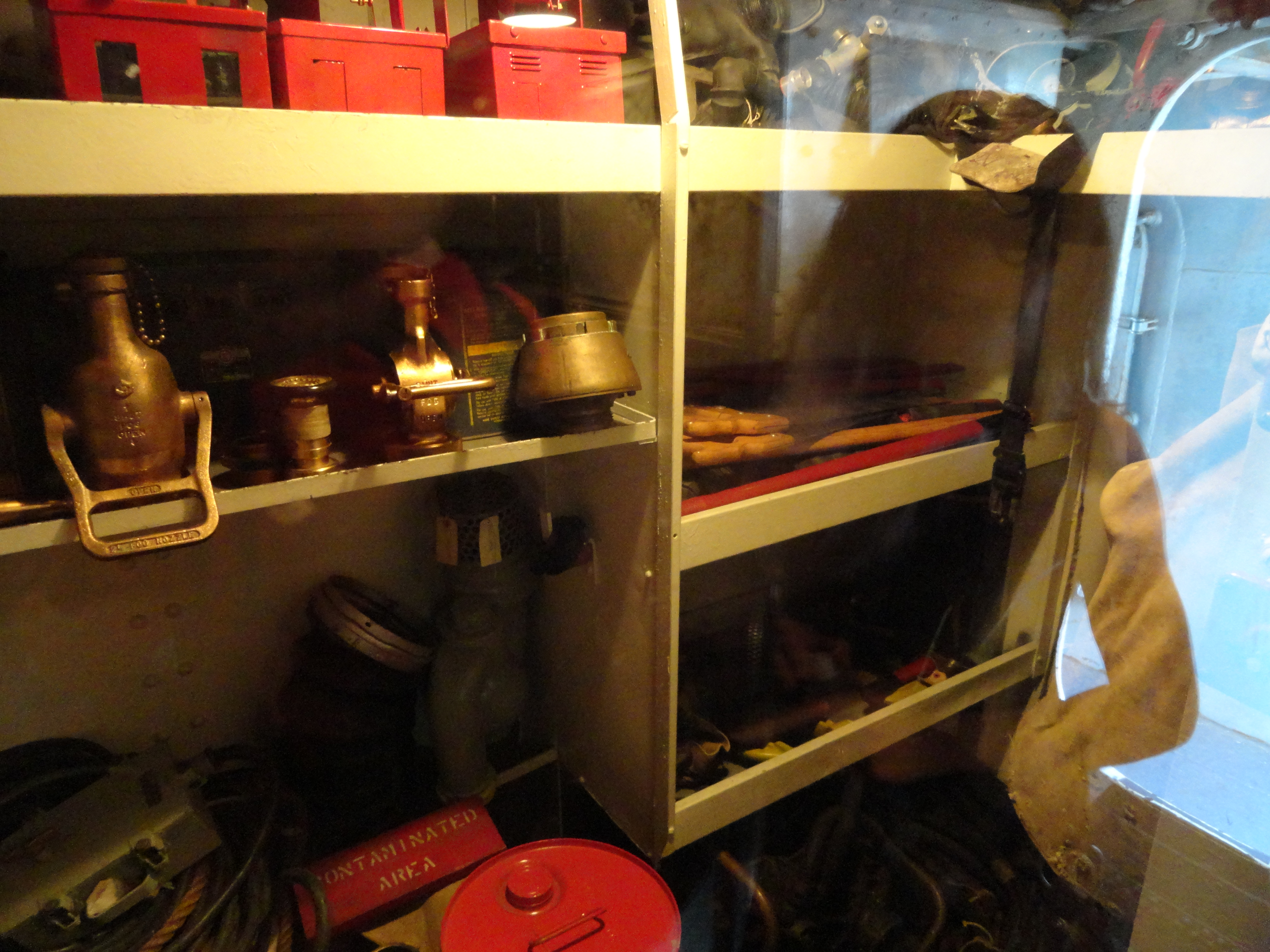
Repair Locker (for Damage Control)

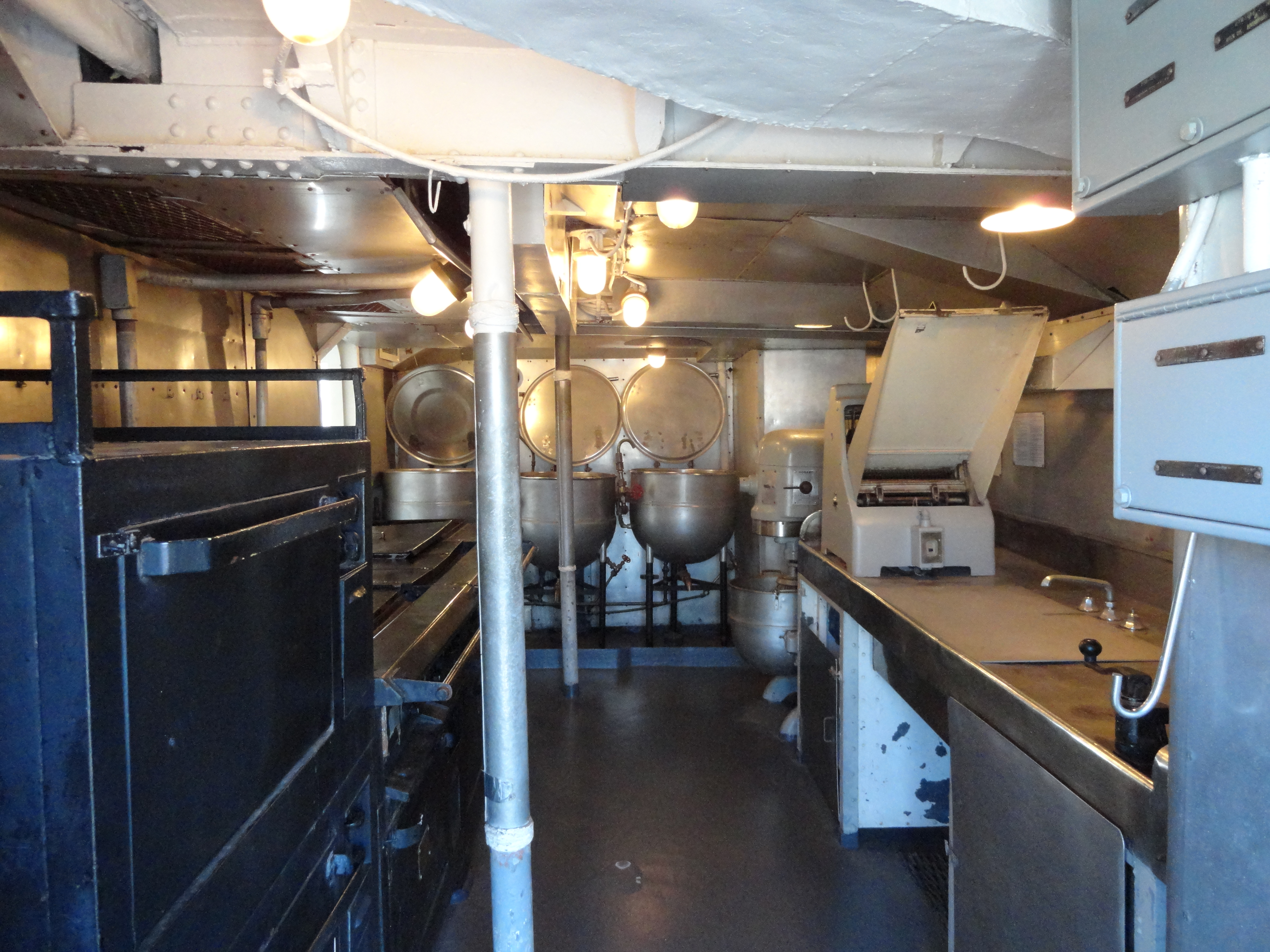
Galley

== See also ==
- Boston National Historical Park
- List of National Historic Landmarks in Boston
- National Register of Historic Places listings in northern Boston, Massachusetts
