= USS Walter X. Young (APD-131) =

- USS Walter X. Young, Tokyo Bay, September 1945

History

United States
- Name: USS Walter X. Young
- Namesake: Walter X. Young
- Ordered: 1942
- Builder: Defoe Shipbuilding Company, Bay City, Michigan
- Laid down: 27 May 1944
- Launched: 30 September 1944
- Commissioned: 1 May 1945
- Decommissioned: 2 July 1946
- Stricken: 1 May 1962
- Fate: Sunk in missile-firing tests, 11 April 1967

General characteristics
- Class & type: Crosley-class high speed transport
- Displacement: 1,450 long tons (1,473 t)
- Length: 306 ft (93 m)
- Beam: 36 ft 10 in (11.23 m)
- Draft: 13 ft 6 in (4.11 m)
- Propulsion: 2 × Combustion Engineering DR boilers; Turbo-electric drive with 2 × General Electric steam turbines; 2 × solid manganese-bronze 3600 lb. 3-bladed propellers, 8 ft 6 in (2.59 m), 7 ft 7 in (2.31 m) pitch; 12,000 hp (8.9 MW); 2 rudders; 359 tons fuel oil
- Speed: 23 knots (43 km/h; 26 mph)
- Range: 3,700 nmi (6,900 km) at 15 kn (28 km/h; 17 mph); 6,000 nmi (11,000 km) at 12 kn (22 km/h; 14 mph)
- Boats & landing craft carried: 4 × LCVPs
- Troops: 162 troops
- Complement: 204 (12 officers, 192 enlisted)
- Armament: 1 × 5"/38 caliber gun; 3 × twin 40 mm guns; 6 × single 20 mm guns; 2 × depth charge tracks

USS Walter X. Young (DE-715/APD-131) was a ship of the United States Navy, named for Lieutenant Walter X. Young (1918–1942), an officer of the United States Marine Corps who was killed in action during the Battle of Guadalcanal.

Originally laid down on 27 May 1944 at the Defoe Shipbuilding Company in Bay City, Michigan, as a Rudderow-class destroyer escort, DE-715, Young was reclassified and redesignated as a Crosley-class high speed transport, APD-131 on 15 July 1944. The ship was launched on 30 September 1944, sponsored by Mrs. John J. McGeeney; and commissioned on 1 May 1945.

== Namesake ==
Walter Xavier Young was born in Chicago, Illinois, on 22 October 1918. He enlisted in the United States Marine Corps Reserve on 6 January 1941, and following training at the Marine Corps Base Quantico, Virginia, was commissioned as a Second Lieutenant on 29 May 1941. After commissioning, Young received training at the U.S. Army Signal Corps School at Fort Monmouth, New Jersey, and was then assigned to the Marine Barracks New River, North Carolina, into 1942.

Promoted to First Lieutenant on 6 June 1942 Young was communications officer of the 1st Marine Parachute Battalion, which took part in the initial landings of the Guadalcanal Campaign in the Solomon Islands. During the initial landings on Gavutu, Young singlehandedly assaulted a Japanese-held dugout commanding a portion of the dock on the island, which was a key objective. While successfully penetrating and neutralizing the dugout, Young was wounded by rifle fire, and died later that day. For his actions Young was awarded the Navy Cross posthumously.

In February 1944, the United States Navy destroyer escort USS Walter X. Young was named for Young, but its construction was cancelled in March 1944.

== Service history ==
After conducting shakedown in Guantanamo Bay, Walter X. Young interrupted her voyage to Norfolk, Virginia, when she transported an emergency appendectomy patient from LSM-406 to Guantanamo Bay for medical attention. Upon the completion of this mission of mercy, she arrived at Hampton Roads, Virginia, on 10 June. Post-shakedown availability and training exercises preceded her sailing south for Fort Pierce, Florida, for specialized training with Underwater Demolition Teams (UDTs). She departed the east coast on 30 July for San Pedro, California; transited the Panama Canal on 3 August, and while en route up the Pacific coast of Mexico, received word of the atomic bomb detonation at Hiroshima on the 6th and, three days later, of a nuclear blast at Nagasaki, and of the Soviet Union's entry into the Pacific War the same day.

Two days after her arrival at San Diego on 12 August, further welcome news arrived, telling that Japan had accepted the unconditional surrender terms of the Potsdam Declaration and had capitulated. As a result of this development, Walter X. Young's original orders, calling for her embarked UDT personnel to take part in the projected invasion of Japan, were cancelled. Instead, the ship received a different mission.

On 16 August, Walter X. Young embarked the 93 men of UDT 22 and after sunset on that date, sailed for the Hawaiian Islands. Arriving at Pearl Harbor on the morning of 22 August, she fueled and provisioned to capacity, loaded UDT explosives, and got underway on the afternoon of the 23rd for Japan.

Her group steamed via the Marshall Islands, arrived in Tokyo Bay on 4 September, and reported to Vice Admiral Theodore S. "Ping" Wilkinson, Commander, 3rd Amphibious Force. With the group now reconstituted as Task Group 32.2 (TG 32.2), as two further APDs and their embarked UDTs joined, they awaited their assignments. The dock areas at Yokohama, the scene for one of the major initial occupation landings, were found to be in good condition, suitable for immediate use. Thus, they did not require reconnoitering by the UDTs for possible mines or other obstructions. Midway through her stay in Tokyo Bay, Walter X. Young was buffeted about by a typhoon. With high winds and seas, she dragged her anchor and eventually shifted anchorage to the lee side of the bay. During the height of the tempest, the APD received word from the cruiser Topeka (CL-67) that one of Young's boats, an LCP(R) which had been loaned to the cruiser, had broken away and been lost. When the storm cleared however, the "missing" craft was seen riding at a painter astern of the cruiser and later was recovered intact.

On 20 September, the ship's waiting period ended. In company with Gantner (APD-42), Walter X. Young got underway on that date for Aomori, on the northern end of Honshū, to conduct a reconnaissance and beach survey, and to clear any obstacles that might impede Army landings. The two APDs escorted Catamount (LSD-17) on this short voyage. While en route on the 21st, the American warships sighted a floating mine and sank it with rifle fire. Upon arrival at Mutsu Kaiwan on the 22nd, Gantner proceeded to Ominato to pick up local Japanese officials to assist in the clearance program. Meanwhile, Young proceeded to Aomori, where, with the aid of underwater sounding devices, she located the hulks of three sunken ships. Swimmers from UDT 22 then attached buoys to them, while a fourth wreck also located during the survey was found to have been already helpfully buoyed by the Japanese.

On 23 September, UDT 22 surveyed the beach and its approaches, as well as the available exits to the main highway which ran parallel to the beach itself, to the eastward of Aomori. They found nothing which required dynamiting, but did attach buoys to some small wrecks at one end of the beach. They reported that the beach was suitable for all types of landing craft; was capable of supporting vehicles; and possessed several exits to the main road. Placing beach markers and drawing up maps of the area, Walter X. Young's UDT conducted an additional survey the following day, thus preparing the way for the landings at Aomori which followed on the 25th and continued throughout the day. Detached on the evening of the 25th, Young reported to Commander, TG 32.2, for orders.

Anchoring at Ominato on the evening of 26 September, the ship obtained information concerning Japanese minefields still extant in Tsugaru Strait, and the next day, got underway for Niigata, on the west coast of Honshū. Proceeding independently, the ship rendezvoused with a Japanese tug, the Japanese craft carrying two American Army officers who had travelled overland from Tokyo, several Japanese police, and a local pilot, off the port. In an ensuing conference, it was learned that although the Japanese claimed to have swept a channel into Niigata, the width of the channel was too narrow to provide a margin of safety for an occupation force of transports. However, some 15 miles north of Niigata lay Senami. Walter X. Young's embarked UDT soon surveyed the beach and found it in excellent condition. Nevertheless, any landings should be conducted in calm weather or with a prevailing offshore wind due to the beach's exposed position on the Sea of Japan. Marking and mapping the beach, UDT 22 reembarked in Walter X. Young, and the ship got underway for Tokyo Bay, stopping at Hakodate, Hokkaidō, en route, to pick up an officer from UDT 22 who had served a tour of detached duty there.

Walter X. Young dropped anchor at Yokohama on 30 September. On 12 October, she got underway for the west coast of the United States, and steamed homeward via Guam and Pearl Harbor. The ship arrived at San Diego on 2 November, and immediately disembarked UDT 22. Ten days of availability at the Naval Repair Base, San Diego, preceded the ship's participation in coastwise transportation of Navy and Marine Corps dischargees within the 11th Naval District.

=== Decommissioning and disposal ===
The ship was decommissioned on 2 July 1946, and placed in reserve at Stockton, California. Struck from the Navy List on 1 May 1962 and stripped of all militarily useful items and equipment, Walter X. Young was towed from her berth with the Stockton Reserve Group to her final duty station, the Naval Missile Center at Point Mugu, California. Subsequently, converted to a test hulk, Walter X. Young was sunk in missile-firing tests on 11 April 1967.
