= USS Walter X. Young (DE-723) =

History

United States
- Name: USS Walter X. Young
- Namesake: First Lieutenant Walter X. Young (1918-1942), a U.S. Marine Corps officer and Navy Cross recipient
- Builder: Dravo Corporation, Pittsburgh, Pennsylvania
- Laid down: Never
- Fate: Construction contract cancelled 12 March 1944

General characteristics
- Class & type: Rudderow destroyer escort
- Displacement: 1,450 tons (standard); 1,810 tons (full load)
- Length: 306 ft (93 m) overall; 300 ft (91 m) waterline
- Beam: 36 ft 10 in (11.23 m)
- Draft: 9 ft 8 in (2.95 m)
- Installed power: 12,000 shaft horsepower (16 megawatts)
- Propulsion: 2 CE boilers, General Electric turbines with electric drive, 2 screws
- Speed: 24 knots {44.5 kilometers per hour)
- Range: 5,050 nautical miles (9,353 kilometers) at 12 knots (22.25 kilometers per hour)
- Complement: 12 officers, 192 enlisted men
- Armament: 2 × 5-inch 38-cal (127-millimeter) (2x1); 4 × 40-mm (2x2); 10 × 20 mm (10x1); 3 × 21-inch torpedo tubes (1x3); 1 Hedgehog depth bomb thrower; 8 depth charge projectors (8x1); 2 depth charge racks

USS Walter X. Young (DE-723) was a proposed United States Navy Rudderow-class destroyer escort that was never built.

The name Walter X. Young was approved for DE-723 on 7 February 1944. Plans called for her to be built by the Dravo Corporation at Pittsburgh, Pennsylvania. However, before work on the ship began, the contract for her construction was cancelled on 12 March 1944 in order to free the Dravo shipyard for the building of landing craft.

The name Walter X. Young was reassigned to another Rudderow-class destroyer escort, USS Walter X. Young (DE-715), which was converted during construction into the fast transport USS Walter X. Young (APD-131).
