= SFC =

SFC may refer to:

== Science, technology and engineering ==
- Scanning Flow Cell, an electrochemical technique based on the principle of channel electrode
- Space-filling curve, a curve whose ranges contain the entire 2-dimensional unit square
- Supercritical fluid chromatography, a form of normal phase chromatography
- Specific fuel consumption (disambiguation)
  - Brake specific fuel consumption (BSFC), the fuel consumption of a shaft engine in terms of its output power
  - Thrust specific fuel consumption (TSFC), the fuel efficiency of a jet engine design in terms of its thrust efficiency
- Super Famicom, the Japanese version of the Super NES video game console
- Shop floor control, the logistic term to follow up the progress and steer the shop floor production plan or schedule

=== Computing ===
- Sequential function chart, a graphical programming language used for programmable logic controllers
- System File Checker, a utility in Microsoft Windows

== Organizations ==
- San Francisco County
- Sea Fisheries Committee, regional fisheries bodies in England and Wales
- Securities and Futures Commission, a Hong Kong regulator
- Software Freedom Conservancy, a not-for-profit organization supporting free software/open source software projects
- South Florida Council, a scouting organization
- Southern Fandom Confederation, an association of science fiction fans
- Strategic Forces Command, part of India's Nuclear Command Authority
- Students for Free Culture, a student activist organization

=== Education ===
- Saad Foundation College, a private residential secondary school in Malacca, Malaysia
- Santa Fe College, a college in Gainesville, Florida, US
- Scottish Funding Council, the public body that distributes funding from the Scottish Government to the country's colleges and universities
- Shonan Fujisawa Campus, Keio University, Fujisawa, Japan
- Singapore Flying College, a wholly owned subsidiary of Singapore Airlines Group
- Sixth form college, an educational institution
- Saint Ferdinand College, a catholic educational institution in the Philippines
- St. Francis College, a private liberal arts college in Brooklyn Heights, New York, US
- Sioux Falls Christian Schools, a private elementary, middle, and high school located in Sioux Falls, South Dakota

=== Politics ===
- Swiss Federal Council, the executive body of the Swiss Government
- Senate Finance Committee, standing committee of the United States Senate

== Sport ==
=== Association football clubs ===
==== England ====
- Scarborough F.C. (dissolved)
- Sheffield F.C.
- Southampton F.C.
- Southport F.C.
- Stamford F.C.
- Stevenage F.C.

==== Northern Ireland ====
- Seagoe F.C.
- Seapatrick F.C.
- Shamrock F.C.
- Suffolk F.C.

==== Scotland ====
- Stranraer F.C.
- Stenhousemuir F.C.
- Spartans F.C.

==== Thailand ====
- Saraburi F.C.
- Sisaket F.C.
- Suphanburi F.C.

==== Other places ====
- Santos Futebol Clube, Brazil
- Seattle Sounders FC, United States
- Seongnam FC, Korea
- Servette FC, Switzerland
- Sevilla FC, Spain
- SFC Opava, Czech Republic
- Shanghai Shenhua F.C., China
- Shelbourne F.C., Ireland
- Shenzhen F.C., China
- Sriwijaya F.C., Indonesia
- Stallion F.C., Philippines
- Sydney FC, Australia
- Syrianska FC, Sweden
- FC Slutsk, Belarus

=== Other meanings in sport ===
- All-Ireland Senior Football Championship, in Gaelic football
- Sammarinese Football Championship
- Slap Fighting Championship otherwise known as SFC, an older professional slap fighting league and competitor to Power Slap

== Other uses ==
- San Francisco Chronicle, a newspaper
- Science Fiction Chronicle, a science-fiction magazine
- State Street Financial Center, the headquarters of State Street Corporation in Boston, Massachusetts
- Semi fixed cost, an expense which is incurred only if the entity had some activity, but is not dependent on the amount of activity
- Stock-Flow consistent model, in economics
- Sergeant first class, the seventh enlisted rank in the US Army
- Southeast Financial Center office skyscraper in Miami, Florida
- Southern fried chicken, a dish consisting of chicken pieces
- Suspended Family Coaster, a roller coaster design by Dutch manufacturer Vekoma
- Starfleet Command, headquarters/command center of Starfleet in Star Trek

== See also ==
- Starfleet Command (disambiguation)
