= Donacloney F.C. =

Donacloney
- Full name: Donacloney Football Club
- Nickname: Cloney
- Founded: 1890
- Ground: The Holmes, Lagan View
- Owner: Trustee Board
- Chairman: Damien Higgins
- Manager: Jamie Boyce
- League: Mid-Ulster Football League

Donacloney Football Club, referred to as Donacloney, or simply Cloney, is an intermediate-level football club playing in the Mid-Ulster Football League in Northern Ireland. Donacloney is based in the village of Donacloney, Craigavon, County Armagh. Founded in 1890, Donacloney F.C. is one of the oldest football teams in the Mid-Ulster region. They are best-known for their Mid-Ulster Cup success in the 1890's to the early 20th-century.

The club is a part of the Mid-Ulster Football Association (MUFA). Donacloney F.C.'s two senior reserves teams compete in the Mid Ulster Reserves League. Donacloney participates in the national Irish Cup.

Donacloney’s senior manager is Andy Neill, and the assistant manager is Jamie Boyce.

== Ground, colours and badge ==
Donacloney F.C. play their home games at The Holmes, Lagan View, which lies beside the River Lagan in the village of Donacloney. Their home kit colours are green and black. Their away colours are red.

Donacloney host coaching sessions for Donacloney Primary School pupils. Donacloney have youth teams compete in the Mid-Ulster youth leagues and youth cup competitions, such as the Savage Cup.

The club's badge is in the style of a coat-of-arms in a shape of a shield. It features the established year, 1890. It also depicts a football, and the club's green, black and red colours. The main pictorial figure is a red lion rampant. The rampant is used heraldry to symbolize courage, nobility, and strength.

== History ==
Donacloney F.C. was formed in 1890 in the village of Donacloney. In their first season, Donacloney went on to win the fourth-edition of the Mid-Ulster Cup. They beat inaugural winners Milford F.C. 3-2 at Banford. In 1893, Donacloney reached their second Mid-Ulster Cup final, beating Portadown F.C. by a landslide, putting 13 goals past them and keeping a clean sheet. This result was the biggest result in Mid-Ulster Cup history. In 1896, the club beat Cookstown F.C. 3-2 in their third Mid-Ulster Cup final in Lurgan.

In 1901, Donacloney would reach their fourth and most-recent Mid-Ulster Cup final. They won the match as a result of a walkover against Glenavon F.C. This was due to Glenavon fielding an ineligible player and thus being disqualified.

In 2005, the club reached the Beckett Cup final. They won it for the first time in their history, beating Dungannon Rovers 2-1 at Loughgall. In 2016, they held their 125th anniversary with their end of season awards night. In attendance were the club chairman and other officials, current and past players and coaches, Mid-Ulster F.A. representatives, family and friends, club sponsors, a council representative and MLA Carla Lockhart.

In 2024, former Irish League Crusaders F.C. and Glenavon F.C. player and then manager, Terry Nicholson played for Donacloney Reserves as goalkeeper, aged 80. He helped the reserves to a 5 - 3 victory over Lisburn Youth F.C. Terry spoke with the Chronicle, saying "I played with Donacloney for my 70th birthday and said at the time I'd be back for my 80th, so they made it happen." The Donacloney Reserves manager Matthew Holmes recalled his 70th birthday match, saying "Terry played for us 10 years ago, in a 5-5 draw against Dungannon Rovers Reserves and he saved a penalty.

== Honours ==
Mid-Ulster Football League

- Mid-Ulster Cup
  - 1890–91, 1892–93, 1895–96, 1900–01
- Beckett Cup
  - 2004/05
