= ISFC =

ISFC may refer to:

- Ikapa Sporting F.C.
- Indicated specific fuel consumption
- International Society and Federation of Cardiology
