= Holm Park =

Football stadium in Armagh, Northern Ireland

Coordinates: 54°20′21.36″N 6°37′34.34″W

- Interactive map of Holm Park
- Full name: Holm Park
- Location: Armagh, Northern Ireland
- Owner: Armagh City F.C.
- Capacity: 3,000
- Surface: Artificial Grass

Construction
- Built: 1992

Tenants
- Armagh City; Windmill Stars

Holm Park is a football stadium in Armagh, Northern Ireland. It is the home ground of Armagh City F.C. The stadium holds 3,000. It is also used by Windmill Stars F.C.

== History ==
Holm Park was built after Milford Everton were unable to continue using their home ground, Holm in Milford due to changes in ground criteria of the Irish League B Division. In 1988, Milford Everton moved to Armagh and looked for a suitable place for a new ground while groundsharing with Armagh Old Boys and renaming themselves Armagh City. Holm Park was built after a lease of land from Armagh City and District Council in 1991. The pitch was laid in 1992 and several additions to the ground continued until 1994.

In 2002, Holm Park was at the centre of a dispute over the location of the Mid Ulster Radcliffe Cup Final between Lurgan Celtic and Loughgall after it was moved from Mourneview Park due to alleged threats against Lurgan Celtic. Holm Park was selected by the Mid-Ulster Football Association as the venue for the final, however Lurgan complained to the Irish Football Association that the vote included Loughgall votes. The IFA referred the matter back to the Mid-Ulster FA who voted again for Holm Park to be the final venue.

In 2009, Holm Park was used by County Fermanagh based Ballinamallard United for their home matches in the IFA Championship 1 as their Ferney Park ground did not meet the Irish Football Association's ground criteria. In 2010, due to constant pitch damage as a result of several matches played on it in short time periods because of postponements, Armagh City applied to Sport Northern Ireland supported by Armagh City and District Council for a grant to install a 3G pitch at Holm Park. At a cost of £425,000, the FIFA approved pitch was installed. It was officially opened with a match between Armagh City and NIFL Premiership team Portadown but the first match was a Bob Radcliffe Cup match against Lurgan Celtic. Holm Park has also hosted the final of the Mid-Ulster Cup as well as Northern Ireland national under-19 football team matches.
