= One Lincoln Street =

Skyscraper in Boston, Massachusetts

- (HarbourVest Financial Center)
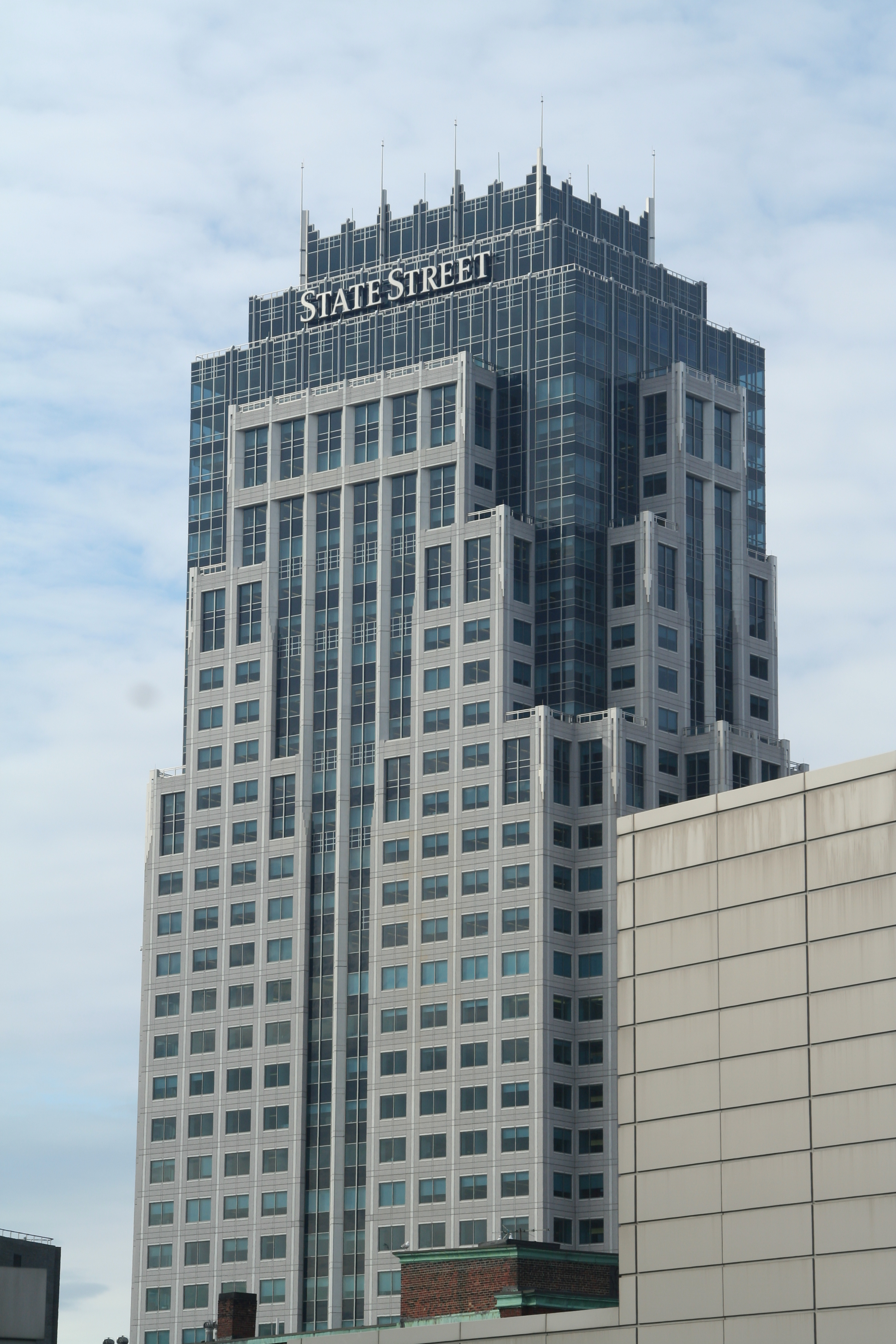
- Interactive map of the One Lincoln Street area

General information
- Type: Office
- Location: 1 Lincoln Street, Boston, Massachusetts
- Coordinates: 42.35254°N 71.05809°W
- Construction started: 2000
- Completed: 2003

Height
- Antenna spire: 503 ft (153 m)
- Roof: 463 ft (141 m)

Technical details
- Floor count: 36
- Floor area: 1,014,176 sq ft (94,220.0 m^{2})

Design and construction
- Architect: Jung Brannen Associates, Inc.
- Developer: American Financial Realty Trust

Website
- https://www.onelincolnboston.com/

One Lincoln Street, also known as HarbourVest Financial Center, is a skyscraper in Boston, Massachusetts on the edge of both the Financial District and neighborhood of Chinatown. Completed in 2003, it was built using Boston Redevelopment Authority (BRA) guidelines. Standing at 503 feet (153 m) tall, One Lincoln Street is the 22nd-tallest building in Boston. The skyscraper has a five-level underground garage that provides parking for 900 cars. It contains 1 million square feet (93,000 square meter) of office space.

The building was designed by TRO Jung Brannen. During the topping off ceremony Mayor Thomas M. Menino stated "One Lincoln will be a tremendous addition to the City and will become a signature gateway to the Financial District". The skyscraper was the headquarters of the State Street Corporation.

== History ==
One Lincoln Street was the first speculative office building developed in downtown Boston since the late 1980s. Originally approved in 1990, One Lincoln was to be the first downtown office building to be developed through the City's Linkage Program which included the investment and participation of a group of City-designated local minority partners, Columbia Plaza Associates. Due to the downturn in the real estate market in the early 1990s, the project was put on hold. As the market recovered and the office vacancy rate dropped, Gale International, backed by Morgan Stanley Real Estate Funds and The State Teachers Retirement System of Ohio entered into a development joint venture with Columbia Plaza Associates in the fall of 1999. The team then completed the design, approval and permitting work for the project and began construction of this $350 million project in April 2000.

On January 2, 2007, American Financial Realty Trust, which owned 70% of the office tower in a partnership with State Street, sold the building to Fortis Property Group for the disclosed sum of $889 million.

== Architectural details ==
The exterior consists of polished and unpolished gray granite for the first two floors. Matching pre-cast panels cover the remaining 35 floors. An aluminum and glass curtain-wall run the center of the building. The top floors step in to provide interest . The ground floors contain retail space. The interior lobby consists of brown, tan, cream French and Italian marble. It is accented with modern Art Deco brushed nickel lighting fixtures.

== Awards ==
- The Building Owners and Managers Association (BOMA) Boston Building of the Year 2003.

== Construction ==
The site was previously occupied by a city-owned parking garage, two four story brick buildings, and a parking lot. After demolition of these structures, a slurry wall was installed around the perimeter, in panels 8–22 feet long. The soil within the slurry was then excavated, and internal bracing installed, with tiebacks along some of the wall. Once the excavation was completed, large spread footings were placed for the internal columns. The below grade parking garage floors were then placed, while erection of the steel frame commenced above. This is known as the up-up approach (as opposed to up-down). As each floor was placed and cured, the internal bracing was removed. This method allowed the foundation to be installed within feet of the existing structures, without any settlement of those structures.

== Neighboring buildings ==
The adjacent Bedford Building is a five-story historic brownstone built in 1876. The rigid three-foot-thick slurry wall installed along the two sides abutting the new construction preserved its structural integrity.

== See also ==
- 1 Lincoln Plaza, a similarly named high-rise in New York City
- List of tallest buildings in Boston
