= Gilford Crusaders F.C. =

Northern Irish football club

Gilford Crusaders
- Full name: Gilford Crusaders Football Club
- Nickname: Crues
- Founded: 1887
- Ground: Woodlands Park
- Chairman: Fergal Anderson
- Manager: Luke Harrison
- League: Mid-Ulster Football League

Gilford Crusaders Football Club, referred to as Gilford Crusaders, is a Junior football team from Gilford, County Down, Northern Ireland. Gilford Crusaders play in the Mid-Ulster Football League. Gilford Crusaders Reserves play in the Mid-Ulster Football Reserves League. Gilford Crusaders are a member of the Mid-Ulster Football Association.

Founded in 1887, Gilford Crusaders are one of the oldest football clubs in Northern Ireland. The club have competed in the Irish Cup.

== Badge, colours and ground ==
Gilford Crusaders home colours are red and black. The badge depicts a Christian Crusader with a sword and shield. They play their home games at Woodlands Park.

== History ==
In 1887, Gilford Crusaders was founded in the village of Gilford, County Down.

In 1921, Gilford Crusaders joined the Portadown and District League 1st Division.

Gilford Crusaders reached the Mid-Ulster Cup final for the first time in 1931, however they would be narrowly beaten by Glenavon F.C. 2–1. In 1932, they reached the Mid-Ulster Cup final for a second consecutive season. Gildford Crusaders would then be beaten again, this time by Portadown F.C. by the same 2–1 score-line.

Gilford Crusaders would then end their Mid-Ulster Cup final drought when in 1935, they went on to win the Mid-Ulster Cup, beating Portadown F.C. 7–2 at Mourneview Park.

In 1940, Gilford Crusaders reached the Alexandra Cup final for the first time and went on to win the silverware.

In the 1948–49 season, Gilford Crusaders reached the Mid-Ulster Shield final, and went on to win it for the first time. Following the Shield success, they reached the Mid-Ulster Cup final for a fourth time, but would be beaten 3–2 by Banbridge Town F.C., missing out on a cup-double.

In May 2012, Gilford Crusaders reached the Foster Cup final. They won the match 4–2 against Stranmillis, clinching their first Foster Cup.

In 2024, the club's community was impacted by the tragedy of former player Conor Molloy, who fell into a coma while living in Australia. A rapid fundraising effort saw almost £30,000 raised in 24 hours to assist the Molloy family with travel expenses from Northern Ireland. Following his death in hospital on 8 November, Gilford Crusaders F.C. released an official tribute to their former player.

== Honours ==
Mid-Ulster Football League

- Division 1
  - 1925–26
- Division 3
  - 2019–20
- Mid-Ulster Cup
  - 1934–35, 1963–64
  - Runners-up: 1930–31, 1931–32, 1948–49
- Mid-Ulster Shield
  - 1948–49
- Alexandra Cup
  - 1939–40
- Foster Cup
  - 2011–12
