= William McCrum =

Inventor of the penalty kick in association football

William McCrum (7 February 1865 – 21 December 1932) was a wealthy Irish linen manufacturer and sportsman from Ulster, most famous for being the inventor in 1890 of the penalty kick in football.

== Life and family ==
Born on 7 February 1865 in Ballynahone Beg townland, outside Milford, County Armagh, William was the son of the linen millionaire Robert Garmany McCrum, JP, DL (1829–1915), and his wife, Anne Eliza Riddall (1840–1869), who was from Limavady, County Londonderry. His father created the famous linen manufacturing firm of McCrum, Watson and Mercer and was the builder of the Victorian era model village of Milford. William studied at The Royal School, Armagh, and then Trinity College Dublin, where he was university champion. He lived at Milford House with his father and later worked for the family business, including a time as London representative and one of the managing directors. William was not a success at running the family business and lacked the business acumen and innovation of his father. He was High Sheriff of Armagh in 1888.

He played for many years as goalkeeper for Milford Football Club, including in the first season of the Irish Football League (1890–1891). Milford finished bottom of the league with 0 points from 14 games, having conceded 62 goals and scored only 10. "Master Willie" as he was known to the villagers also spent his spare time taking part in amateur theatrics in the Milford village hall, called the McCrum Institute.

When not travelling the world, he spent a large proportion of his life living in Milford where he was a justice of the peace and representative of many sporting clubs and committees including Milford FC, Milford and Armagh cricket clubs, and Armagh Rugby Football Club. He played chess for Armagh and participated in individual and team competitions and also submitted games.

Milford FC. William McCrum is on the middle row second from the left

== Marriage ==
William McCrum enjoyed gambling in Monte Carlo and having a good time. In one weekend alone he accumulated debts in six figures. His father paid the debt on this occasion. In 1891 he married Maude Mary Squires, daughter of W.W. Squires of Montreal, Canada. They had one son, Cecil (1892–1976), who was later Captain of HMS Hood. William was a shareholder in the family firm McCrum, Watson and Mercer and acted as a factory agent. In 1897, William and Maude were living at Hartford Place on the Mall in Armagh city when Maude was implicated in scandals involving gentlemen in the national newspapers. Maude could not show her face in society and went to Liverpool with her son, and William stuck by her and went to Liverpool too. His father, Robert G. McCrum, thought William would not return and was advised by his American agents to make the firm a public liability with shares in the stock market. It appears William and Maude equally enjoyed a good lifestyle and quickly accumulated debts of over £2,000. William and Maude later returned to Armagh, but in 1903 Maude ran off to the French Riviera with a Major Heard. William lived at Milford House with his father. At this point, Maude was given an allowance by her father-in-law, Robert G. McCrum, provided she didn't divorce William. Her father-in-law stipulated in his Will that she would lose the allowance if she divorced or ever remarried after William's death. Maude waited until 1932 before marrying Major Heard.

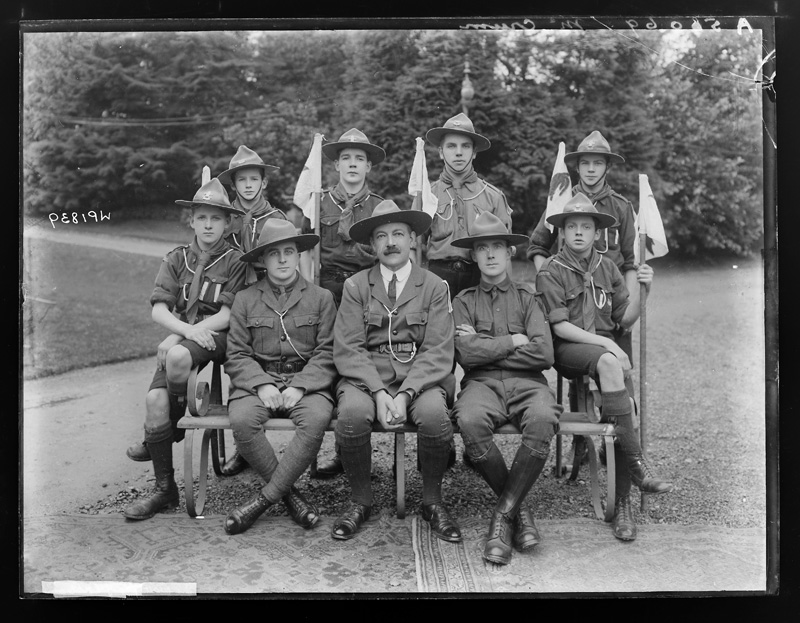
Scoutmaster William McCrum with the scouts of Milford in County Armagh, 15th October 1917

In 1915, Robert G. McCrum died and William inherited Milford village in Co. Armagh and half the shares in McCrum, Watson & Mercer. The Will stated that William had the right to live at Milford House and use its contents, but if he ceased to live there for more than six months of the year, the property would pass to his sister Mrs. Harriette Miller. He later became chairman of the firm. He was passionate about the scout movement and was Head of the Scout organisation in Northern Ireland. He once said in Armagh Court that the Milford Scout Troop may be mill boys, but they are the best kind of gentlemen. He was friends with Baden Powell and often dined with them. He presented a cup to Armagh Cricket club and was highly thought of. In 1928, he went to the White House as part of delegation of the Northern Ireland linen industry.

== Decline and death ==
In 1929, the Wall Street crash hit the fortunes of McCrum, Watson & Mercer hard. It had large business interests in America. The firm collapsed and the Northern Bank seized control of Milford factory and village. In November 1930, the entire contents of Milford House were dispersed at auction. William went to live with his family in England. It was not a great success. His grandson Tony remembers that he could tell within two minutes if you were capable of playing chess or not – William said Tony wasn't, but his brother Michael could. William later returned to Armagh city where he lived in a boarding house in Victoria Street. On 21 December 1932, he was taken to Armagh Infirmary where he died of a heart attack. He is buried with his parents and grandparents in St. Mark's Churchyard, Armagh. The grave was restored by funding from FIFA in 2015.

== Legacy ==
Milford House became Manor House School Northern Ireland’s only Country House Residential School for girls. In 1966, it became Manor House Special Care Hospital. Since 1994, Milford House has been derelict and is today one of the top ten listed buildings at most serious risk in Northern Ireland.

The British writer and former literary editor of The Observer, Robert McCrum, is his grandson, and wrote about William McCrum:

Shut out of the family business as a lightweight, eventually deserted by a faithless wife and coldly ignored by his father, Master Willie travelled the world, lived high on the hog and was well-known as a gambler.

Another grandson, Mark McCrum, an English journalist and travel writer, made references to William McCrum in his book, The Craic – A Journey through Ireland.

Today, William McCrum and the Milford House are famously known as the home of the penalty kick, and appear in some form of media in the world every five minutes.

== The penalty kick ==
It was in his role as member of the Irish Football Association that McCrum proposed the idea of the penalty kick to stop the prevalent practice at the time of defenders professionally fouling an attacking player to stop a goal. The idea was submitted to the June 1890 meeting of the International Football Association Board by the Irish FA's general secretary and IFAB representative Jack Reid.

The original proposal read:

If any player shall intentionally trip or hold an opposing player, or deliberately handle the ball within twelve yards from his own goal line, the referee shall, on appeal, award the opposing side a penalty kick, to be taken from any point 12 yards from the goal line, under the following conditions: All players, with the exception of the player taking the penalty kick and the goalkeeper, shall stand behind the ball and at least six yards from it; the ball shall be in play when the kick is taken. A goal may be scored from a penalty kick.

The proposal initially generated much derision and indignation amongst footballers and the press as the "Irishman's motion" or the "death penalty" as it was known, conceded that players might deliberately act unsportingly. This went against the Victorian idea of the amateur gentleman sportsman. Public opinion may have changed after an FA Cup quarter final between Stoke City and Notts County on 14 February 1891 where an indirect free kick after a deliberate handball on the goal line did not result in a goal.

The penalty kick rule was approved as number 13 in the Laws of the Game, a year after it was proposed, on 2 June 1891, at the Alexandra Hotel, Bath St., in Glasgow "after considerable discussion" and with changes affecting where the goalkeeper and other players could legally stand.

== Family ==
His great-great-grandson Jake Lush McCrum was CEO of the Indian Premier League franchise Rajasthan Royals between 2021 and 2025.

== Gallery ==
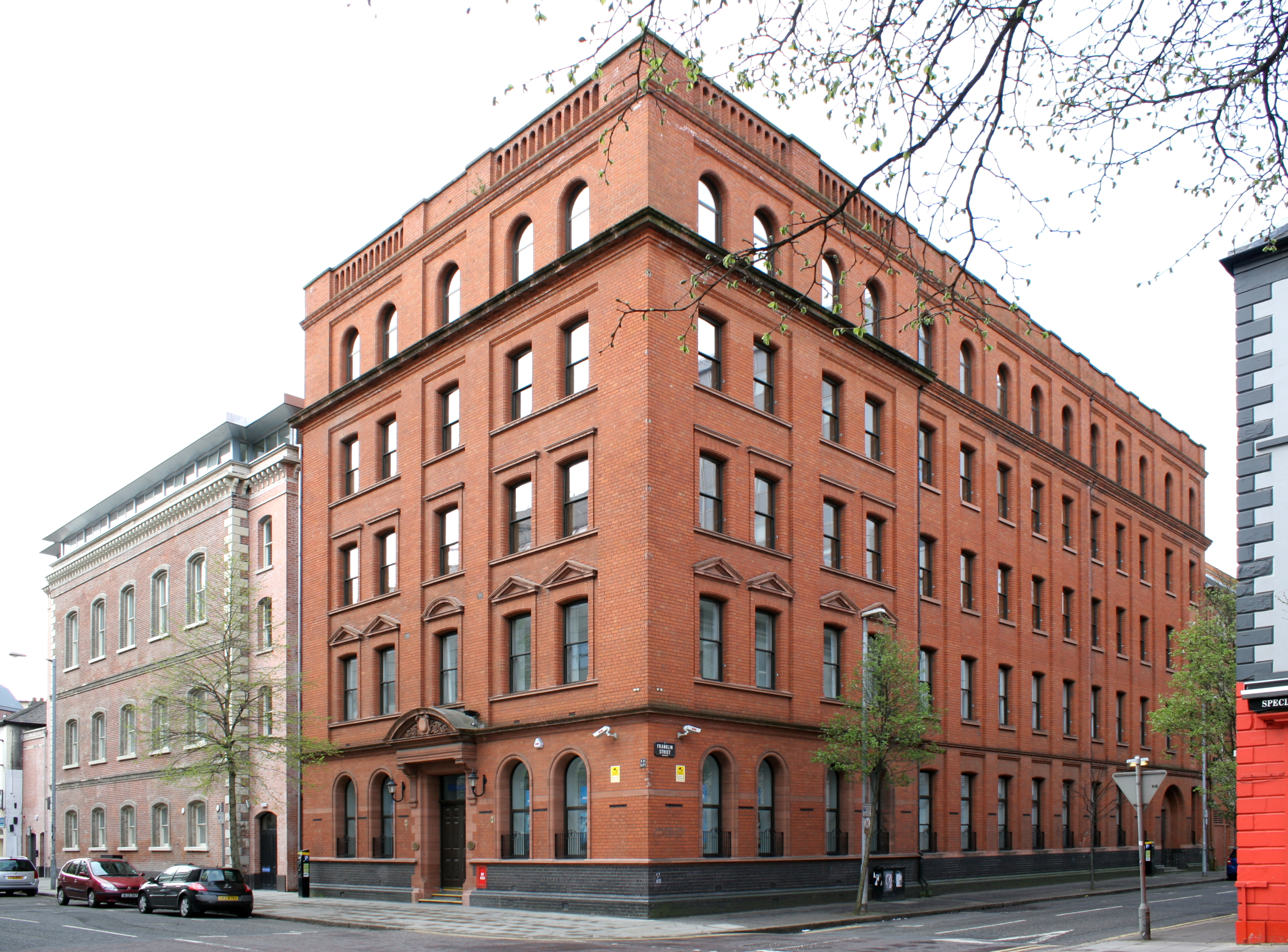
McCrum & Watson Warehouse, Belfast
