= 1890–91 Irish League =

Irish League
- Season: 1890–91
- Dates: 6 September 1890 – 30 April 1891
- Champions: Linfield; 1st Irish title
- Matches: 49
- Goals: 337 (6.88 per match)
- Top goalscorer: Robert Hill (20 goals)
- Biggest home win: Linfield 14–0 Oldpark
- Biggest away win: Cliftonville 0–8 Linfield; Milford 0–8 Glentoran; Milford 1–9 Distillery; Oldpark 2–10 Ulster
- Highest scoring: Linfield 14–0 Oldpark; Linfield 9–5 Ulster

The 1890–91 Irish League was the inaugural edition of the Irish League, the highest level of league competition in Irish football organised by the Irish Football Association.

For this season, the league used a double round-robin format, where teams played each other both home and away once. It comprised eight teams, and was won by Linfield.

== Formation ==
On 14 March 1890, on the invitation of J. W. Gordon, representative from eight clubs - Clarence, Cliftonville, Distillery, Glentoran, Linfield, Milford, Oldpark and Ulster - met in the Belfast Estate Office of Frederick Hamilton-Temple-Blackwood, 1st Marquess of Dufferin and Ava. Within fifteen, minutes, the league was constituted. The twelve attendees of the meeting were W. McNeice, J. R. Spiller, W. Finlay, W. Couser, J. McClatchley, S. Monroe, J. McKnight, C. Birkby, J. Torrans, J. W. Gordon, J. Henderson and W. S. Dawson. The first officials appointed were W. McNeice (chairman), W. Finlay (treasurer) and J. W. Gordon (honorary secretary).

== Teams and locations ==
Location of teams in the 1890–91 Irish League
Location of Belfast teams in the 1890–91 Irish League

Team	Town	Home Ground
Clarence	Belfast	Stranmillis
Cliftonville	Belfast	Solitude
Distillery	Belfast	Grosvenor Park
Glentoran	Belfast	King's Field
Linfield	Belfast	Ulsterville
Milford	Armagh	Milford
Oldpark	Belfast	Oldpark
Ulster	Belfast	Ulster Cricket Ground

== League standings ==
Pos	Team	Pld	W	D	L	GF	GA	GR	Pts	Result
1	Linfield (C)	14	12	1	1	89	18	4.944	25	Champions
2	Ulster	14	9	3	2	72	39	1.846	21	
3	Distillery	14	9	1	4	46	37	1.243	19	
4	Cliftonville	14	7	3	4	37	46	0.804	17	
5	Glentoran	14	6	1	7	39	38	1.026	13	
6	Oldpark	14	4	2	8	22	48	0.458	10	
7	Clarence	14	3	1	10	21	49	0.429	7	Withdrew
8	Milford (Note: Milford resigned from the league on 20 January 1891 with five games still to play. These remaining games were awarded to their opponents and a 0–0 scoreline was registered.)	14	0	0	14	10	61	0.164	0	Withdrew

Source: rsssf.com
(C) Champions

== Results ==
Home \ Away	CLA	CLI	DIS	GLT	LIN	MIL	OLD	ULS
Clarence		2–5	3–4	5–4	1–3	+:- (Note: Match rated as goalless home win.)	1–3	2–6
Cliftonville	2–2		7–3	0–0	0–8	3–2	2–2	4–1
Distillery	4–0	1–6		4–2	2–1	+:-	2–0	3–5
Glentoran	9–1	4–3	0–3		0–7	4–2	2–0	-:+ (Note: Match rated as goalless away win.)
Linfield	5–2	10–2	6–2	6–0		9–1	14–0	9–5
Milford	-:+	-:+	1–9	0–8	1–6		-:+	2–7
Oldpark	+:-	2–3	2–4	2–3	0–3	5–0		2–10
Ulster	4–2	9–0	4–4	5–2	2–2	10–1	4–4	

Source: Irish League Archive
Legend: Blue = home team win; Yellow = draw; Red = away team win.

== Top goalscorers ==
Pos	Player	Club	Goals
1	Robert Hill	Linfield	20
2	John Peden	Linfield	19
3	Sam Torrans	Linfield	18
