= Mid-Ulster Cup =

- Organiser(s): Mid-Ulster Football Association
- Founded: 1887
- Region: Northern Ireland
- Current champions: Annagh United (1st title)
- Most championships: Glenavon (22 titles)

The Mid-Ulster Cup is a senior football competition in Northern Ireland run by the Mid-Ulster Football Association (founded 2 April 1887). The competition has historically featured teams based in County Armagh, east County Tyrone, and west County Down, though teams from outside the Mid-Ulster FA's jurisdiction have also competed on occasion, with Bangor (affiliated to the County Antrim & District F.A.) winning the cup in 1995/96.

== History ==
First held in 1887–88, the inaugural edition was won by Milford. For 30 seasons, from 1947–48 to 1977–78, while remaining a senior competition, senior clubs declined to take part, instead fielding their reserve teams. Senior clubs returned, however, for the 1978–79 season, when the Bob Radcliffe Cup was introduced as an intermediate competition.

The biggest recorded victory in Mid-Ulster cup final history came in the 1892–93 season, when Donacloney beat Portadown 13–0.

The competition is currently sponsored by EuroElectrix, and has been sponsored in the past by Golden Cow Dairies, Dukes Transport, Tennent's Lager, Bass, Ted Clarke, McEwan's Lager, Silverwood Hotel, Rushmere Shopping Centre and Belfast Telegraph.

== List of finals ==
Season	Winner	Score	Runner-Up	Venue	Notes
1887–88	Milford	3–1	Loughgall (1887)	Milford	
1888–89	Milford	4–0	Loughgall (1887)	Caledon	
1889–90	East Lancashire Regiment	2–0	Milford	Brownlow	
1890–91	Donacloney	3–2	Milford	Banford	
1891–92	Banford				Details of final unknown.
1892–93	Donacloney	13–0	Portadown		
1893–94	15th King's Hussars	2–1	Royal Irish Rifles	Donacloney	Replay after original match finished in a 3–3 draw.
1894–95	Duke of Cornwall's Light Infantry	5–0	Glenavon	Gilford	
1895–96	Donacloney	3–2	Cookstown	Lurgan	
1896–97	Milltown Wanderers	2–0	Portadown	Mourneview Park	Replay after original match, which ended in a 1-0 victory to Milltown, was ordered to be replayed after a Portadown protest.
1897–98	Glenavon	5–3	Portadown	Gilford	
1898–99	Portadown	5–3	Lurgan Star	Gilford	Replay after original match finished in a 5–5 draw.
1899–1900	Portadown	3–2	Cookstown	Mourneview Park	Replay after original match finished 1-0 to Portadown but Cookstown protested an ineligible player was used.
1900–01	Donacloney	w/o	Glenavon		
1901–02	Glenavon	—	Cookstown	—	Cup was played on league basis.
1902–03	Portadown	2–1	Glenavon	Drumcairn, Armagh	
1903–04	Portadown	2–1	Monaghan	Monaghan	
1904–05	Glenavon	3–1	Portadown		
1905–06	Portadown	3–0	Glenavon		
1906–07	Glenavon	3–0	Portadown	Celtic Park	Replay after original fixture ended 2-2.
1907–08	Portadown	2–1	Glenavon	Grosvenor Park	
1908–09	Glenavon	2–1	Portadown		
1909–10	Portadown	3–2	Lurgan Celtic †		
1910–11	Glenavon	w/o	Portadown Celtic		Original game ended 2-1 to Portadown Celtic, but they played ineligible player and were ordered to replay the match which they refused to do.
1911–12	Lurgan Celtic †	1–0	Portadown	Windsor Park	Replay after original fixture ended 1-1.
1912–13	Lurgan Celtic †	2–0	Bessbrook	Grosvenor Park	
1913–14	Lurgan Rangers	2–1	Glenavon Reserves		
1914–15	Lurgan Celtic †	3–1	Portadown	Grosvenor Park	
1915–24	not played				
1924–25	Glenavon	2–1	Lurgan B-Specials	Mourneview Park	
1925–26	Glenavon	3–1	Portadown		
1926–27	not awarded				Banbridge United defeated Newry Town 3–2 in the final at Shamrock Park, however the cup was withheld as Banbridge fielded ineligible players.
1927–30	not played				
1930–31	Glenavon	2–1	Gilford Crusaders	Shamrock Park	
1931–32	Portadown	2–1	Gilford Crusaders	Mourneview Park	
1932–33	Glenavon	2–1	Sunnyside		
1933–34	Portadown	6–1	Glenavon		2nd replay after two previous matches finished 0-0.
1934–35	Gilford Crusaders	7–2	Portadown	Mourneview Park	
1935–36	Sunnyside	3–1	Portadown	Shamrock Park	
1936–37	Newry Town	2–1	Glenavon	Shamrock Park	
1937–38	Glenavon	2–1	Newry Town	Shamrock Park	
1938–39	Newry Town	3–1	Portadown Reserves	The Marshes, Newry	Final was played in September of the 1939–40 season.
1939–46	not played				
1946–47	Portadown Reserves	3–2	Sunnyside	Mourneview Park	
1947–48	Glenavon Reserves	2–1	Newry Town	Shamrock Park	
1948–49	Banbridge Town	3–2	Gilford Crusaders	Shamrock Park	
1949–50	Banbridge Town and Dromore Athletic (shared)				Trophy was shared after final finished in a 2–2 draw.
1950–51	Seapatrick	4–1	Warrenpoint United	Banbridge	
1951–52	Seapatrick	4–3	Bessbrook	Shamrock Park	
1952–53	Tandragee Rovers	3–2	Portadown Reserves	Mourneview Park	
1953–54	Tandragee Rovers	2–1	Seapatrick	Shamrock Park	
1954–55	Seapatrick	1–0	Holm Factory		
1955–56	Tandragee Rovers	4–0	Bessbrook	Newry Showgrounds	
1956–57	Newry Town	2–1	Tandragee Rovers	Banbridge	
1957–58	Glenavon Reserves	2–1	Newry Town	Mourneview Park	After replay
1958–59	Banbridge Town	3–1	Tandragee Rovers	Shamrock Park	
1959–60	Tandragee Rovers	4–0	Woodvale Recreation		
1960–61	Portadown Reserves		Banbridge Town	Shamrock Park	
1961–62	Tandragee Rovers	2–0	Glenavon Reserves	Shamrock Park	
1962–63	Portadown Reserves	2–1	Glenavon Reserves	Shamrock Park	
1963–64	Newry Town	2–0	Portadown Reserves	Mourneview Park	
1964–65	Portadown Reserves	3–2	Banbridge Town	Mourneview Park	After extra time (2-2 full time).
1965–66	Glenavon Reserves	3–2	Tandragee Rovers	Mourneview Park	
1966–67	Newry Town	4–3	Tandragee Rovers	Shamrock Park	
1967–68	Blane's	1–0	Tandragee Rovers		
1968–69	Newry Town	3–1	Damolly Textiles		After extra time (1-1 full time).
1969–70	Portadown Reserves	2–1	Tandragee Rovers		
1970–71	Dungannon Swifts	3–1	Lurgan Celtic	Banbridge	Replay after original match finished 2–2.
1971–72	Glenavon Reserves	5–2	Hanover	Mourneview Park	
1972–73	New Century	3–2	Newry Town		
1973–74	Banbridge Town	2–1	Newry Town		
1974–75	Newry Town	5–2	New Century	Banbridge	
1975–76	Dungannon Swifts	2–0	Milford Everton		
1976–77	Glenavon Reserves	4–3	Banbridge Town	Newry Showgrounds	After extra time.
1977–78	Newry Town	3–1	Banbridge Town	Shamrock Park	
1978–79	Newry Town	2–1	Portadown	Shamrock Park	
1979–80	Banbridge Town	1–0	Newry Town	Shamrock Park	
1980–81	Portadown	1–0	Glenavon	Shamrock Park	
1981–82	Portadown	1–1	Glenavon	Mourneview Park	Portadown won 4–3 on penalties.
1982–83	Portadown	2–1	Glenavon	Mourneview Park	
1983–84	Glenavon	2–0	Newry Town	Stangmore Park	
1984–85	Newry Town	4–1	Portadown	Newry Showgrounds	
1985–86	Glenavon	1–0	Oxford United	Mourneview Park	
1986–87	Newry Town	4–1	Glenavon	Newry Showgrounds	
1987–88	Dungannon Swifts	2–1	Glenavon	Shamrock Park	First final played under floodlights.
1988–89	Glenavon	1–0	Newry Town	Shamrock Park	
1989–90	Newry Town	4–0	Banbridge Town	Shamrock Park	
1990–91	Glenavon	3–1	Portadown	Mourneview Park	
1991–92	not awarded				Glenavon defeated Portadown 2–1 after extra time in the final at Mourneview Park, however the trophy was withheld as Glenavon fielded an ineligible player.
1992–93	Portadown	2–1	Newry Town	Stangmore Park	
1993–94	Portadown	3–0	Dungannon Swifts	Shamrock Park	
1994–95	Portadown	4–1	Newry Town	Stangmore Park	
1995–96	Bangor	3–1	Dungannon Swifts	Shamrock Park	
1996–97	Dungannon Swifts	2–1	Distillery	Lakeview Park	
1997–98	Portadown	0–0	Dungannon Swifts	Mourneview Park	Portadown won 6–5 on penalties.
1998–99	Glenavon	3–1	Ards	Mourneview Park	
1999–2000	Newry Town	1–0	Banbridge Town	Lakeview Park	
2000–01	Armagh City	3–1	Newry Town	Newry Showgrounds	
2001–02	Portadown	5–1	Lurgan Celtic	Stangmore Park	2nd replay (held over to following season). Game 1: 2-2; Game 2: 1-1 (abandoned due to waterlogged pitch).
2002–03	Portadown	3–1	Dungannon Swifts	Stangmore Park	
2003–04	Loughgall	2–2	Newry Town	Lakeview Park	Loughgall won 3–1 on penalties.
2004–05	Glenavon	1–0	Loughgall	Lakeview Park	
2005–06	Dungannon Swifts	3–1	Glenavon	Mourneview Park	
2006–07	Newry City	2–1	Annagh United	Holm Park	
2007–08	Loughgall	2–0	Banbridge Town	Holm Park	After extra time.
2008–09	Dungannon Swifts	2–1	Loughgall	Stangmore Park	
2009–10	Glenavon	3–2	Loughgall	Mourneview Park	
2010–11	Glenavon	2–0	Dungannon Swifts	Stangmore Park	
2011–12	Newry City	1–0	Glenavon	Mourneview Park	
2012–13	Dungannon Swifts	2–1	Banbridge Town	Stangmore Park	After extra time.
2013–14	Dungannon Swifts	3–1	Annagh United	Holm Park	After extra time.
2014–15	Dungannon Swifts	3–2	Armagh City	Stangmore Park	After extra time.
2015–16	Dungannon Swifts	2–1	Armagh City	Holm Park	
2016–17	Warrenpoint Town	3–2	Armagh City	Stangmore Park	After extra time.
2017–18	Glenavon	3–1	Newry City AFC	Newry Showgrounds	
2018–19	Glenavon	4–3	Warrenpoint Town	Stangmore Park	
2019–20	Loughgall	3–2	Glenavon	Lakeview Park	
2020–21	Glenavon	1–0	Loughgall	Mourneview Park	
2021–22	Warrenpoint Town	4–2	Annagh United	Holm Park	
2022–23	Newry City AFC	2–0	Dungannon Swifts	Stangmore Park	
2023–24	Portadown	5–2	Dungannon Swifts	Shamrock Park	
2024–25	Dungannon Swifts	2–1	Loughgall	Stangmore Park	
2025–26	Annagh United	2–0	Rathfriland Rangers	Stangmore Park	

Lurgan Celtic † – spiritual descendant of Lurgan Celtic F.C.

== Performance by club ==
Club	Winners	Runners-up	Winning years	Runners-up years
Glenavon	22	15	1897–98, 1901–02, 1904–05, 1906–07, 1908–09, 1910–11, 1924–25, 1925–26, 1930–31, 1932–33, 1937–38, 1983–84, 1985–86, 1988–89, 1990–91, 1998–99, 2004–05, 2009–10, 2010–11, 2017–18, 2018–19, 2020–21	1894–95, 1900–01, 1902–03, 1905–06, 1907–08, 1933–34, 1936–37, 1980–81, 1981–82, 1982–83, 1986–87, 1987–88, 2005–06, 2011–12, 2019–20
Portadown	19	14	1898–99, 1899–1900, 1902–03, 1903–04, 1905–06, 1907–08, 1909–10, 1931–32, 1933–34, 1980–81, 1981–82, 1982–83, 1992–93, 1993–94, 1994–95, 1997–98, 2001–02, 2002–03, 2023–24	1892–93, 1896–97, 1897–98, 1904–05, 1906–07, 1908–09, 1911–12, 1914–15, 1925–26, 1934–35, 1935–36, 1978–79, 1984–85, 1990–91
Newry City AFC‡	16	13	1936–37, 1938–39, 1956–57, 1963–64, 1966–67, 1968–69, 1974–75, 1977–78, 1978–79, 1984–85, 1986–87, 1989–90, 1999–2000, 2006–07, 2011–12, 2022–23	1937–38, 1947–48, 1957–58, 1972–73, 1973–74, 1979–80, 1983–84, 1988–89, 1992–93, 1994–95, 2000–01, 2003–04, 2017–18
Dungannon Swifts	11	7	1970–71, 1975–76, 1987–88, 1996–97, 2005–06, 2008–09, 2012–13, 2013–14, 2014–15, 2015–16, 2024-25	1993–94, 1995–96, 1997–98, 2002–03, 2010–11, 2022–23, 2023–24
Tandragee Rovers	5	6	1952–53, 1953–54, 1955–56, 1959–60, 1961–62	1956–57, 1958–59, 1965–66, 1966–67, 1967–68, 1969–70
Glenavon Reserves	5	3	1947–48, 1957–58, 1965–66, 1971–72, 1976–77	1913–14, 1961–62, 1962–63
Portadown Reserves	5	3	1946–47, 1960–61, 1962–63, 1964–65, 1969–70	1938–39, 1952–53, 1963–64
Banbridge Town	5 (1 shared)	8	1948–49, 1949–50 (shared), 1958–59, 1973–74, 1979–80	1960–61, 1964–65, 1976–77, 1977–78, 1989–90, 1999–2000, 2007–08, 2012–13
Donacloney	4	0	1890–91, 1892–93, 1895–96, 1900–01	—
Loughgall	3	5	2003–04, 2007–08, 2019–20	2004–05, 2008–09, 2009–10, 2020–21, 2024-25
Lurgan Celtic (1903)	3	1	1911–12, 1912–13, 1914–15	1909–10
Seapatrick	3	1	1950–51, 1951–52, 1954–55	1953–54
Milford	2	2	1887–88, 1888–89	1889–90, 1890–91
Warrenpoint Town	2	1	2016–17, 2021–22	2018–19
Armagh City	1	4	2000–01	1975–76, 2014–15, 2015–16, 2016–17
Gilford Crusaders	1	3	1934–35	1930–31, 1931–32, 1948–49
Sunnyside	1	2	1935–36	1932–33, 1946–47
New Century	1	1	1972–73	1974–75
East Lancashire Regiment	1	0	1889–90	—
Banford	1	0	1891–92	—
15th King's Hussars	1	0	1893–94	—
Duke of Cornwall's Light Infantry	1	0	1894–95	—
Milltown Wanderers	1	0	1896–97	—
Lurgan Rangers	1	0	1913–14	—
Blane's	1	0	1967–68	—
Bangor	1	0	1995–96	—
Dromore Athletic	1 (shared)	0	1949–50	—
Cookstown	0	3	—	1895–96, 1899–1900, 1901–02
Bessbrook	0	3	—	1912–13, 1951–52, 1955–56
Annagh United	1	3	2025-26	2006–07, 2013–14, 2021–22
Loughgall (1887)	0	2	—	1887–88, 1888–89
Lurgan Celtic	0	2	—	1970–71, 2001–02
Royal Irish Rifles	0	1	—	1893–94
Lurgan Star	0	1	—	1898–99
Monaghan	0	1	—	1903–04
Portadown Celtic	0	1	—	1910–11
Lurgan B-Specials	0	1	—	1924–25
Warrenpoint United	0	1	—	1950–51
Holm Factory	0	1	—	1954–55
Woodvale Recreation	0	1	—	1959–60
Damolly Textiles	0	1	—	1968–69
Hanover	0	1	—	1971–72
Oxford United	0	1	—	1985–86
Distillery	0	1	—	1996–97
Ards	0	1	—	1998–99

‡ Although Newry City A.F.C. were formed in 2013, they are widely recognised as being the spiritual successor to Newry City F.C. and their 2022–23 Mid-Ulster Cup win has been recognised as the club's 16th title, despite it being the first time they have won the competition since their formation.

== See also ==
County Antrim Shield

North West Senior Cup

Bob Radcliffe Cup
