= Penalty kick (association football) =

Type of direct free kick in association football

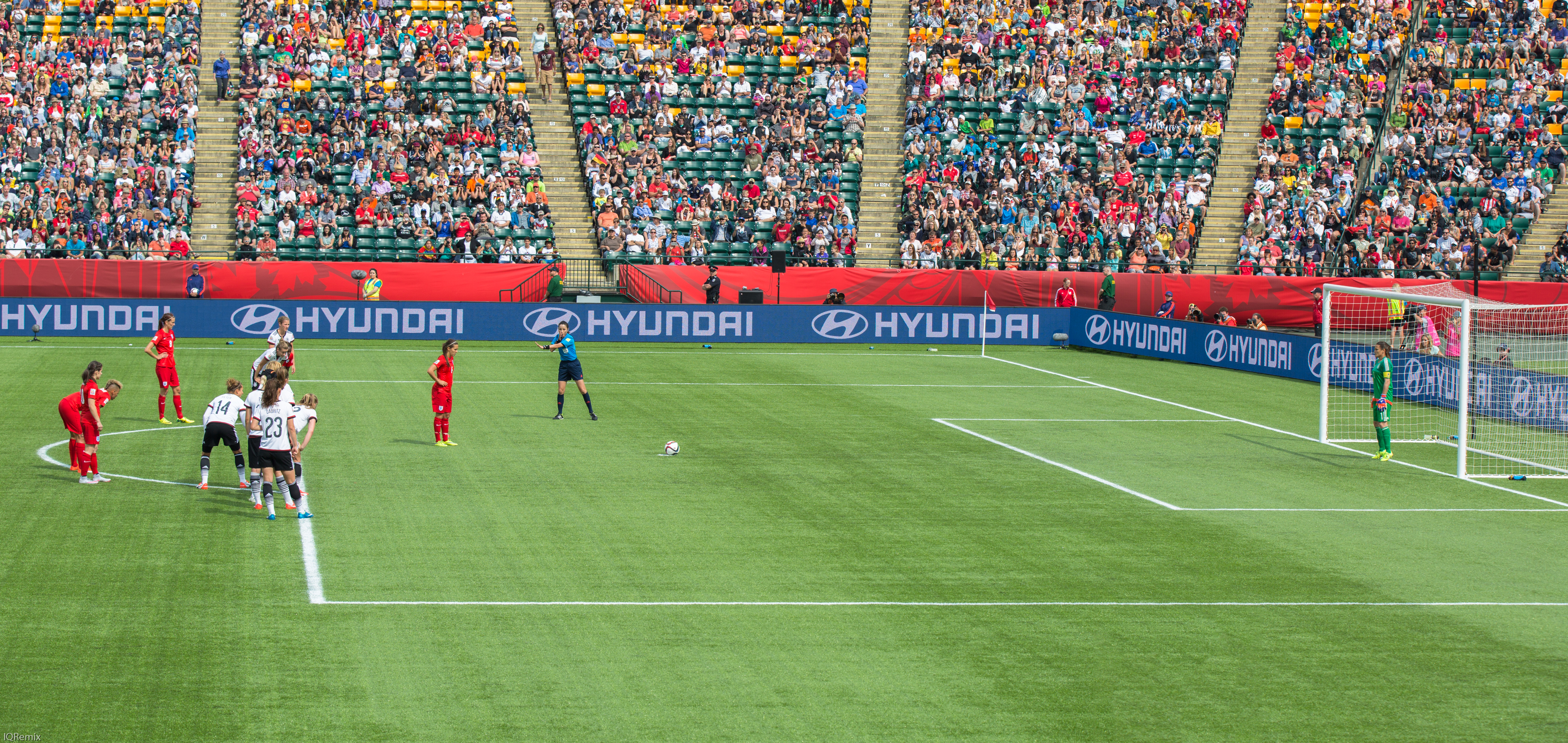
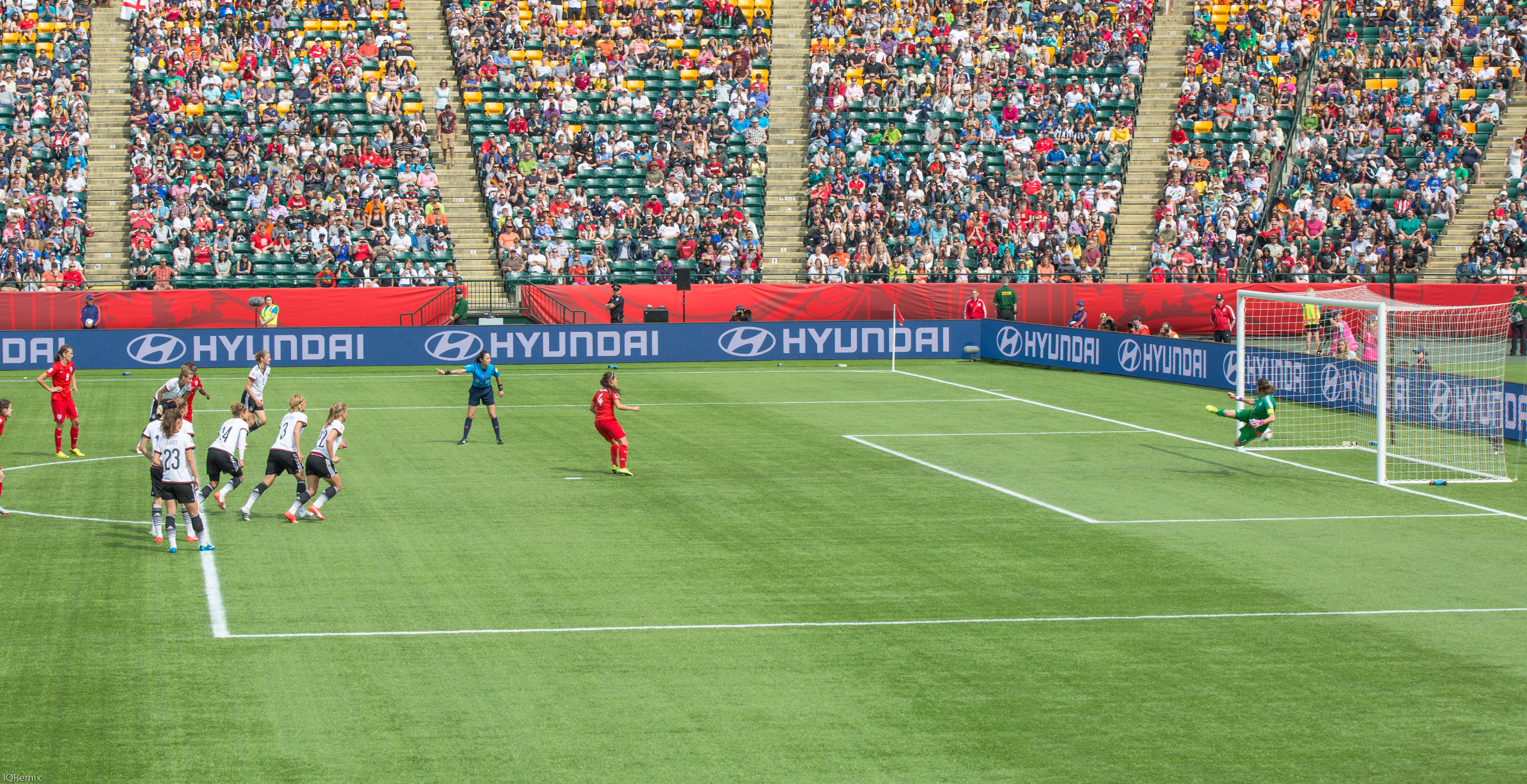
A penalty kick before and after the shot is taken

A penalty kick, commonly known as a penalty, pen or a spot kick, is a method of restarting play in association football, in which a player is allowed to take a single shot at the goal while it is defended only by the opposing team's goalkeeper. It is awarded when an offence punishable by a direct free kick is committed by a player in their own penalty area. The shot is taken from the penalty spot, which is 12 yards (11 metres) from the goal line, and centered between the touch lines.

== Procedure ==
The ball is placed on the penalty spot, regardless of where the foul occurred within the penalty area. The player taking the kick must be identified to the referee. Only the kicker and the defending team's goalkeeper are allowed to be within the penalty area; all other players must be within the field of play, outside the penalty area, behind the penalty mark, and at least 9.15 m (10 yd) from the penalty mark (this distance is denoted by the penalty arc). The goalkeeper is allowed to move before the ball is kicked, but must remain on the goal line between the goalposts, facing the kicker, without touching the goalposts, crossbar, or goal net. At the moment the kick is taken, the goalkeeper must have at least part of one foot touching, or in line with, the goal line. The assistant referee responsible for the goal line where the penalty kick is being taken is positioned at the intersection of the penalty area and goal line, and assisting the referee in detecting infringements and determining whether a goal is scored.

The referee blows the whistle to indicate that the penalty kick may be taken. The penalty taker may not kick the ball before the whistle is blown. The kicker may make feinting (deceptive or distracting) movements during the run-up to the ball, but may not do so once the run-up is completed. The kick and the last step the kicker takes must be in motion. The ball must be stationary before the kick, and it must be kicked forward. The ball is in play once it is kicked and moves, and at that time other players may enter the penalty area and the penalty arc. The kicker may not touch the ball a second time until it has been touched by another player of either team or goes out of play (including into the goal); if the ball hits the goalpost or crossbar, without the goalkeeper having made contact with it, and rebounds into play, the kicker may not touch it again until after another player has done so.

== Infringements ==
In case of an infringement of the laws of the game during a penalty kick, most commonly entering the penalty area illegally, the referee must consider both whether the ball entered the goal, and which team(s) committed the offence. If both teams commit an offence, the penalty kick is retaken.

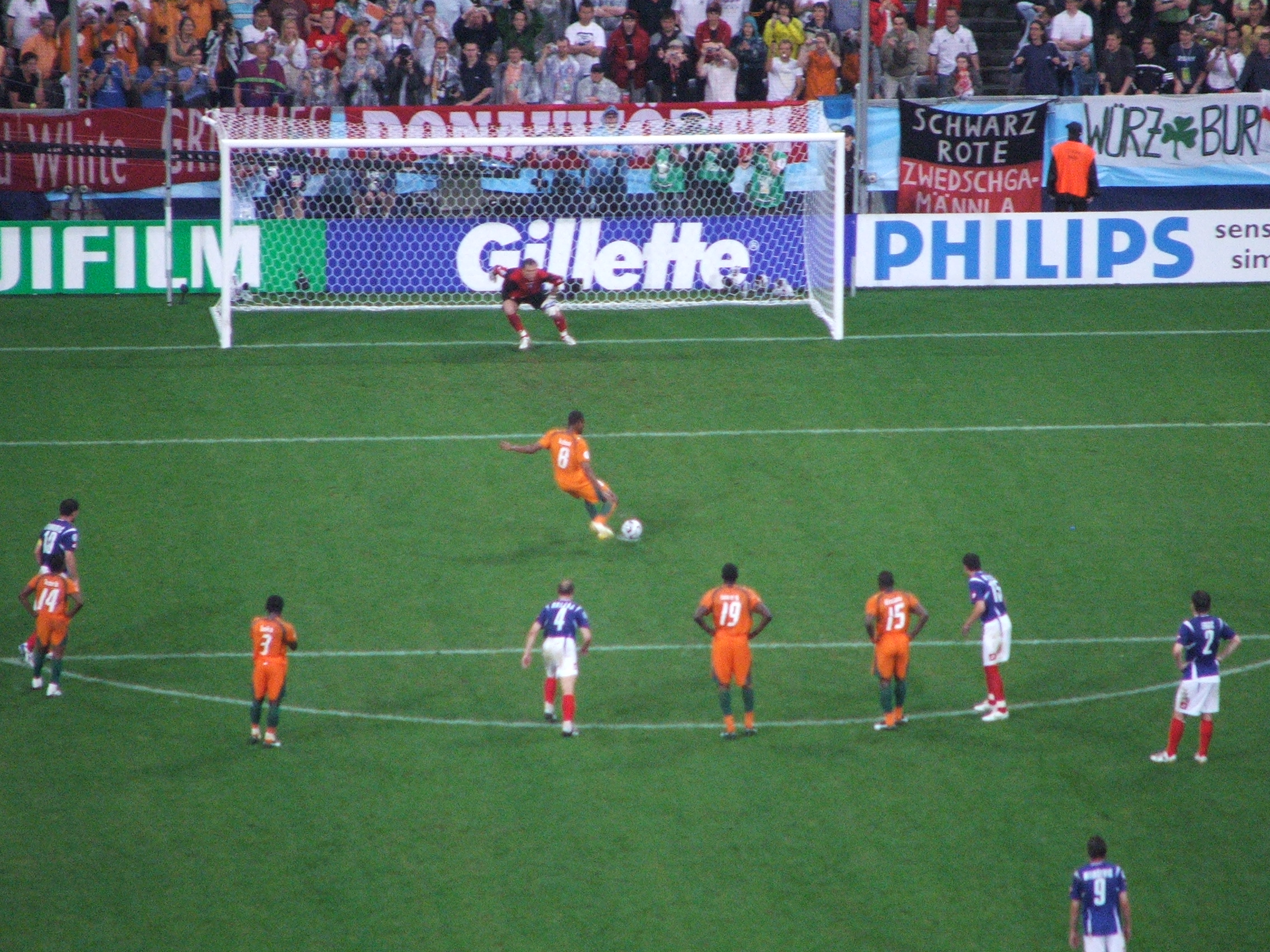
A penalty being taken by Bonaventure Kalou at the 2006 FIFA World Cup

Results of a penalty kick
Result of the kick	No violation	Violation by the attacking team only	Violation by the defence only
Enters the goal	Goal	Retaken	Goal
Goes directly out of bounds	Goal kick	Goal kick	Retaken
Rebounds into play from goal frame/goalkeeper	Play continues	Indirect free kick	Retaken
Saved & held by goalkeeper	Play continues	Play continues	Retaken
Deflected out of bounds by goalkeeper	Corner kick	Indirect free kick	Retaken

The following infringements committed by the kicking team result in an indirect free kick for the defending team, regardless of the outcome of the kick:

- a teammate of the identified kicker kicks the ball instead (the player who took the kick is cautioned)
- kicker feints kicking the ball at the end of the run-up (the kicker is cautioned)
- kick does not go forward
- kicker deliberately touches the ball a second time before it touches another player (includes rebounds off the goal posts or crossbar)
  - if the second touch is accidental, the International Football Association Board (IFAB) clarified in 2025 that the kick should be retaken.

In the case of a player repeatedly infringing the laws during the penalty kick, the referee may caution the player for persistent infringement. All offences that occur before kick may be dealt with in this manner, regardless of the location of the offence.

If the ball touches an outside agent (i.e., an object foreign to the playing field) as it moves forward from the kick, the kick is retaken.

== Tap penalty ==
A two-man penalty, or "tap" penalty, occurs when the kicker, instead of shooting for goal, taps the ball slightly forward so that a teammate can run on to it and shoot or pass. If properly executed, it is a legal play since the kicker is not required to shoot for goal and need only kick the ball forward. This strategy relies heavily on the element of surprise, as it first requires the goalkeeper to believe the kicker will actually shoot, then dive or move to one side in response. It then requires the goalkeeper to remain out of position long enough for the kicker's teammate to reach the ball before any defenders, and for that teammate to place a shot on the undefended side of the goal.

The first recorded tap penalty was taken by Jimmy McIlroy and Danny Blanchflower of Northern Ireland against Portugal on 1 May 1957. Another was taken by Rik Coppens and André Piters in the World Cup qualifying match Belgium versus Iceland on 5 June 1957. Another attempt was made by Mike Trebilcock and John Newman, playing for Plymouth Argyle in 1964. In 1982, Johan Cruyff passed to his Ajax team-mate Jesper Olsen, who then passed back, allowing Cruyff to tap in for a goal.

Arsenal players Thierry Henry and Robert Pires failed in an attempt at a similar penalty in 2005, during a Premier League match against Manchester City at Highbury. Pires ran in to take the kick, attempted to pass to the onrushing Henry, but miskicked and the ball hardly moved; as he had slightly touched the ball, he could not touch it again, and City defender Sylvain Distin cleared the ball before Henry could shoot.

Lionel Messi tapped a penalty for Luis Suárez as Suárez completed his hat-trick on 14 February 2016 against league opponents Celta de Vigo.

== Saving tactics ==
=== "Reading" the kicker ===
American goalkeeper Kasey Keller saves a penalty kick taken by Thierry Henry in a Major League Soccer match.

An example of a penalty kick scored during an Under-16 French amateur match.

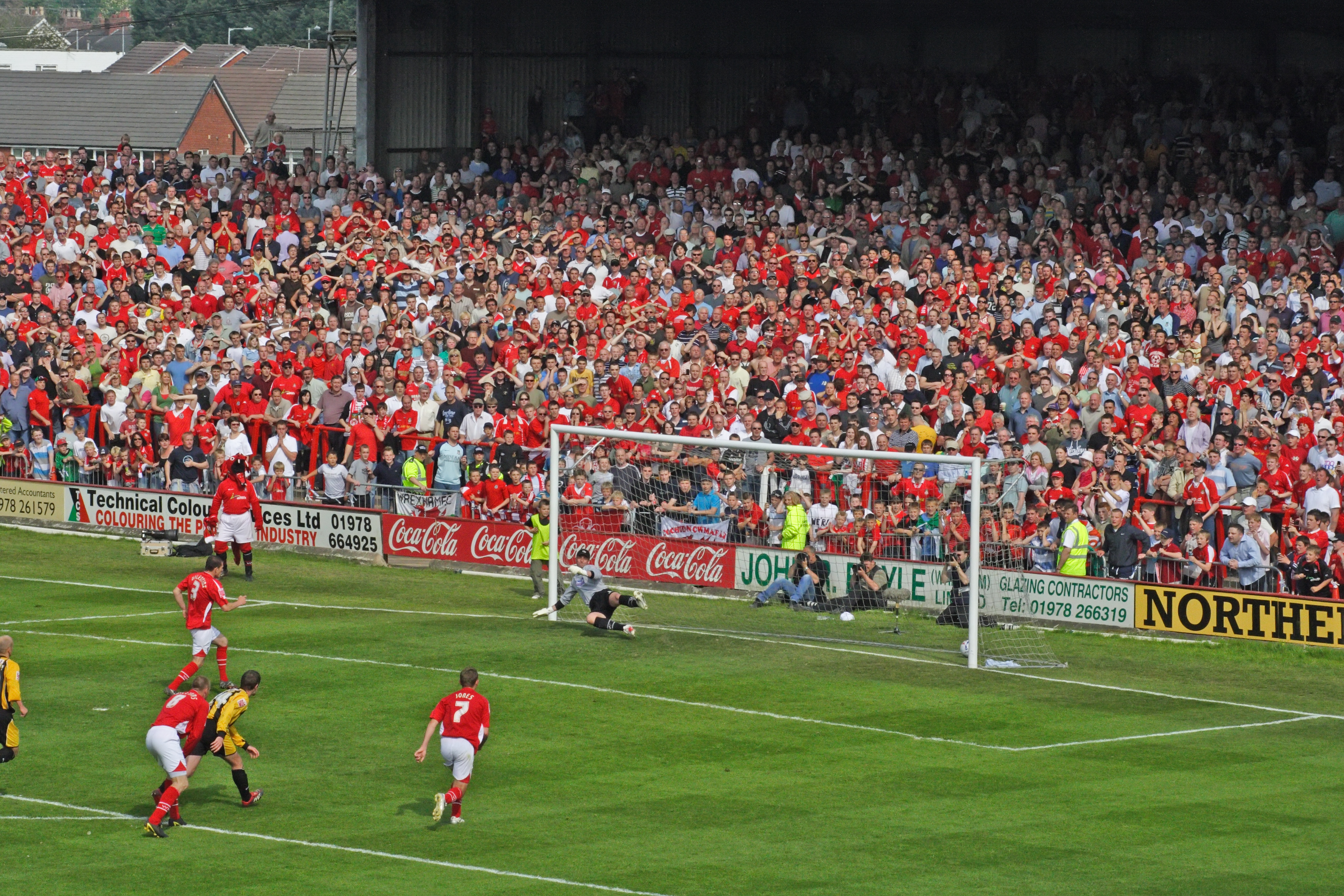
A penalty being scored by Ryan Valentine (red, no. 3).

Defending against a penalty kick is one of the most difficult tasks a goalkeeper can face. Owing to the short distance between the penalty spot and the goal, there is very little time to react to the shot. Because of this, the goalkeeper will usually start their dive before the ball is actually struck. In effect, the goalkeeper must act on their best prediction about where the shot will be aimed. Some goalkeepers decide which way they will dive beforehand, thus giving themselves a good chance of diving in time. Others try to read the kicker's motion pattern. On the other side, kickers often feign and prefer a relatively slow shot in an attempt to foil the goalkeeper. The potentially most fruitful approach, shooting high and centre, i.e., in the space that the goalkeeper will evacuate, also carries the highest risk of shooting above the bar (or even hitting it).

As the shooter makes their approach to the ball, the goalkeeper has only a fraction of a second to "read" the shooter's motions and decide where the ball will go. If their guess is correct, this may result in a missed penalty. Helmut Duckadam, Steaua București's goalkeeper, saved a record four consecutive penalties in the 1986 European Cup Final against Barcelona. He dived three times to the right and a fourth time to his left to save all penalties taken, securing victory for his team.

=== Use of knowledge of kicker's history ===
A goalkeeper may also rely on knowledge of the shooter's past behaviour to inform their decision. An example of this would be by former Netherlands national team goalkeeper Hans van Breukelen, who always had a box with cards with all the information about the opponent's penalty specialist. Ecuadorian goalkeeper Marcelo Elizaga saving a penalty from Carlos Tevez in a 2010 FIFA World Cup qualifier between Ecuador and Argentina, revealed that he had studied some penalty kicks from Tevez and suspected he was going to shoot to the goalkeeper's left side. Two other examples occurred during the 2006 FIFA World Cup:

- Portugal national team goalkeeper Ricardo in a quarter-final match against England, where he saved three penalties out of four.
- The quarter-final match between Argentina and Germany also came down to penalties, and German goalkeeper Jens Lehmann was seen looking at a piece of paper kept in his sock before each Argentinian player would come forward for a penalty kick. Lehmann had researched the penalty taking habits of seven players on the Argentinian team. However, only two players on his list ended up taking a penalty that day. On the attempts by those two players, Lehmann saved one and came close to saving the other. He then had to guess on Esteban Cambiasso's kick since he did not have any information written on his list about Cambiasso. However, he derived an educated guess from the videos he had studied and pretended to read the piece of paper and nodded his head before putting it away, implying to Cambiasso that he did in fact have information on the kicker. Lehmann guessed correctly and saved the penalty, thus winning the shootout for Germany. "Lehmann's list" became so popular in the annals of German football history that it is now in the Haus der Geschichte museum.

This approach may not always be successful; the player may intentionally switch from their favoured spot after witnessing the goalkeeper obtaining knowledge of their kicks. Most times, especially in amateur football, the goalkeeper is often forced to guess. Game theoretic research shows that both the penalty taker and also the goalkeeper must randomize their strategies in precise ways to avoid having the opponent take advantage of their predictability.

=== Distraction ===
The goalkeeper also may try to distract the penalty taker, as the expectation is on the penalty taker to succeed, hence more pressure on the penalty taker, making them more vulnerable to mistakes. For example, in the 2008 UEFA Champions League Final between Manchester United and Chelsea, United goalkeeper Edwin van der Sar pointed to his left side when Nicolas Anelka stepped up to take a shot in the penalty shoot out. This was because all of Chelsea's penalties went to the left. Anelka's shot instead went to Van der Sar's right, which was saved. Liverpool goalkeeper Bruce Grobbelaar used a method of distracting the players called the "spaghetti legs" trick to help his club defeat Roma to win the 1984 European Cup. This tactic was emulated in the 2005 UEFA Champions League Final, which Liverpool also won, by Liverpool goalkeeper Jerzy Dudek, helping his team defeat Milan.

An illegal method of saving penalties is for the goalkeeper to make a quick and short jump forward just before the penalty taker connects with the ball. This not only shuts down the angle of the shot, but also distracts the penalty taker. The method was used by Brazilian goalkeeper Cláudio Taffarel. FIFA was less strict on the rule during that time. In more recent times, FIFA has advised all referees to strictly obey the rule book.

Similarly, a goalkeeper may also attempt to delay a penalty by cleaning their boots, asking the referee to see if the ball is placed properly and other delaying tactics. This method builds more pressure on the penalty taker, but the goalkeeper may risk punishments, most likely a yellow card.

A goalkeeper can also try to distract the taker by talking to them prior to the penalty being taken. Netherlands national team goalkeeper Tim Krul used this technique during the penalty shootout in the quarter-final match of the 2014 FIFA World Cup against Costa Rica. As the Costa Rican players were preparing to take the kick, Krul told them that he "knew where they were going to put their penalty" in order to "get in their heads". This resulted in him saving two penalties and the Netherlands winning the shootout 4–3.

Argentine goalkeeper Emiliano Martínez is known for using mind games in shootouts, most notably when he talked to the Colombian players as they went to take their penalties in the 2021 Copa América semifinal, and throwing the ball away when Aurélien Tchouaméni was about to kick in the 2022 FIFA World Cup final.

Tactics used by goalkeepers to reduce the probability of kickers succeeding with their kicks include:

- Visually distracting the kicker (e.g. pointing, gesturing)
- Verbally irritating, annoying or provoking the kicker
- Physically confronting the kicker
- Delaying the kicker (e.g. the goalkeeper taking a long time to position themself for the kick)

=== Saving statistics ===
Some goalkeepers have become well known for their ability to save penalty kicks. One such goalkeeper is Diego Alves, who boasts a 49 per cent save success rate. Other goalkeepers with high save rates include Claudio Bravo, Kevin Trapp, Samir Handanović, Gianluigi Buffon, Tim Krul, Danijel Subašić, Sergio Goycochea, Sergio Romero, and Manuel Neuer.

== Scoring statistics ==
Penalty conversion rate by zone of the goalmouth, based on 1,708 Premier League penalties from the 2006/07 season to December 2024.

Even if the goalkeeper succeeds in blocking the shot, the ball may rebound back to the penalty taker or one of their teammates for another shot, with the goalkeeper often in a poor position to make a second save. This makes saving penalty kicks more difficult. This is not a concern in penalty shoot-outs, where only a single shot is permitted.

While penalty kicks are considerably more often successful than not, missed penalty kicks are not uncommon: for instance, of the 78 penalty kicks taken during the 2005–06 English Premier League season, 57 resulted in a goal, thus almost 30% of the penalties were unsuccessful.

A German professor who has been studying penalty statistics in the German Bundesliga for 16 years found 76% of all the penalties during those 16 years went in, and 99% of the shots in the higher half of the goal went in, although the higher half of the goal is a more difficult target to aim at. Penalty kicks in the Bundesliga were scored 74.25% when considering all penalty kicks between 1963/1964 and 2003/2004. The conversion rate between 2008/2009 and 2021/2022 in different European leagues was higher (running from 76.5% in the Primera Division to 79.8% in the Eredivisie). Penalty kicks taken during shootouts in the World Cup were only scored 69.4% of the time. During his career, Italian striker Roberto Baggio had two occurrences where his shot hit the upper bar, bounced downwards, rebounded off the keeper and passed the goal line for a goal.

== Offences for which the penalty kick is awarded ==
A penalty kick is awarded whenever an offence that would attract a direct free-kick is committed by a player within that player's own penalty area while the ball is in play (the ball must be in play at the time of the offence, but it does not need to be within the penalty area at that time). These include:

- handball (excluding handling offences committed by the goalkeeper)
- any of the following offences against an opponent, if committed in a manner considered by the referee to be careless, reckless or using excessive force:
  - charges
  - jumps at
  - kicks or attempts to kick
  - pushes
  - strikes or attempts to strike (including head-butt)
  - tackles or challenges
  - trips or attempts to trip
- holds an opponent
- impedes an opponent with contact
- bites or spits at someone
- throws an object at the ball, an opponent or a match official, or makes contact with the ball with a held object (the location of the offence is considered to be the position where the object struck or would have struck the person or the ball, or the nearest boundary line if this is off the field of play).
- any physical offence against a team-mate, substitute, substituted or sent-off player, team official or a match official
- a player who requires the referee's permission to re-enter the field of play, substitute, substituted player, sent-off player, or team official enters the field of play without the referee's permission, and interferes with play (A rare example of this offence occurred in an October 2019 match between Holstein Kiel and VfL Bochum: Kiel substitute Michael Eberwein, warming up behind his own team's goal-line, kicked the ball before it had gone out of play. The referee awarded a penalty to Bochum after VAR review.)
- a player who requires the referee's permission to re-enter the field of play, substitute, substituted player, sent-off player or team official is on the field of play without the referee's permission while that person's team scores a goal (the goal is disallowed; the location of the offence is considered to be the location of the offender at the time the disallowed goal was scored).
- a player temporarily off the field of play, substitute, substituted player, sent-off player or team official throws or kicks an object onto the field of play, and the object interferes with play, an opponent, or a match official (the location of the offence is considered to be the place where the thrown or kicked object interfered with play, or struck or would have struck the opponent, match official or the ball).

A penalty kick is also awarded if, while the ball is in play, a player, substitute, substituted player, sent-off player or team official commits any direct free-kick offence against a match official or against an opposing player, substitute, substituted player, sent-off player, or team official outside the field of play, provided that the closest boundary line to the location of the offence is within the offending team's own penalty area.

== History ==
=== Early proposals ===
The original laws of the game, in 1863, had no defined punishments for infringements of the rules. In 1872, the indirect free kick was introduced as a punishment for illegal handling of the ball; it was later extended to other offences. This indirect free-kick was thought to be an inadequate remedy for a handball which prevented an otherwise-certain goal. As a result of this, in 1882 a law was introduced to award a goal to a team prevented from scoring by an opponent's handball. This law lasted only one season before being abolished in 1883.

One possible reason for its abolition is that it was felt to be too harsh, especially given the imprecise nature of refereeing at the time. Another possibility is that it was simply not seen as necessary, as the indirect free kick was thought to be a sufficient punishment for most handball offences.

=== Introduction of the penalty kick ===
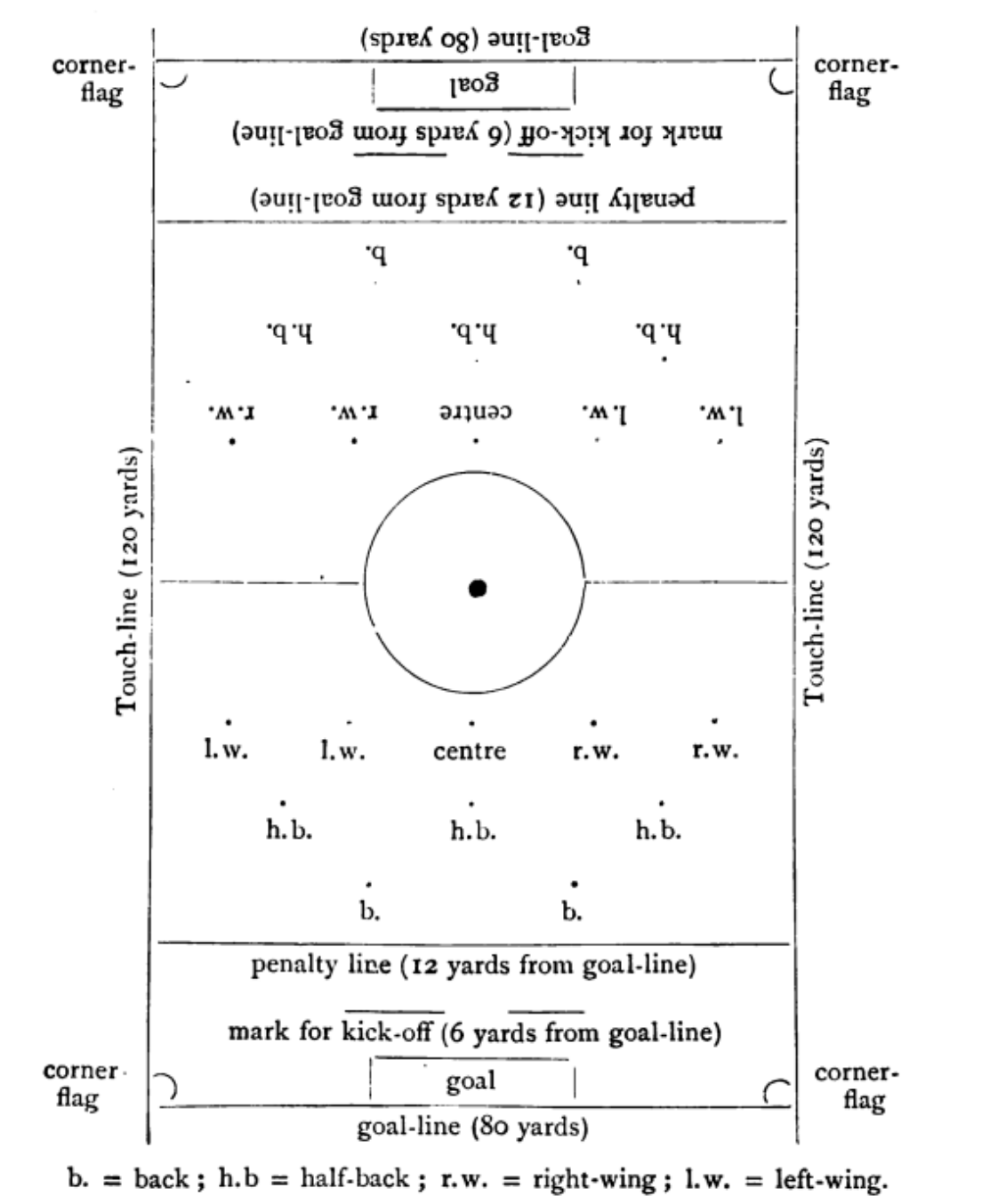
When first introduced in 1891, the penalty was awarded for offences within 12 yards (11 m) of the goal-line.

The invention of the penalty kick is credited to the goalkeeper and businessman William McCrum in 1890 in Milford, County Armagh. The Irish Football Association presented the idea to the International Football Association Board's 1890 meeting, where it was deferred until the next meeting in 1891.

Two incidents in the 1890–1 season lent additional force to the argument for the penalty kick. On 20 December 1890, in the Scottish Cup quarter-final between East Stirlingshire and Heart of Midlothian Jimmy Adams fisted the ball out from under the bar, and on 14 February 1891, there was a blatant goal-line handball by a Notts County player in the FA Cup quarter-final against Stoke City.

Finally after much debate, the International Football Association Board approved the idea on 2 June 1891. The penalty-kick law ran:

If any player shall intentionally trip or hold an opposing player, or deliberately handle the ball, within twelve yards [11 m] from his own goal-line, the referee shall, on appeal, award the opposing side a penalty kick, to be taken from any point twelve yards [11 m] from the goal-line, under the following conditions:— All players, with the exception of the player taking the penalty kick and the opposing goalkeeper (who shall not advance more than six yards [5.5 m] from the goal-line) shall stand at least six yards [5.5 m] behind the ball. The ball shall be in play when the kick is taken, and a goal may be scored from the penalty kick.

Some notable differences between this original 1891 law and today's penalty-kick are listed below:

- It was awarded for an offence committed within 12 yards (11 m) of the goal-line (the penalty area was not introduced until 1902).
- It could be taken from any point along a line 12 yards (11 m) from the goal-line (the penalty spot was likewise not introduced until 1902).
- It was awarded only after an appeal.
- There was no restriction on dribbling.
- The ball could be kicked in any direction.
- The goalkeeper was allowed to advance up to 6 yards (5.5 m) from the goal-line.

The world's first penalty kick was awarded just 5 days after the change had been approved and introduced to the rules of the game by the Scottish Football Association. It was awarded to Airdrieonians against Royal Albert in the final of the Airdrie Charity Cup on 6 June 1891 at Airdrieonians' then home ground of Mavisbank Park 15 minutes into the match, with the eventual spot-kick being buried past the Albert keeper. The first penalty kick in the Football League was awarded to Wolverhampton Wanderers in their match against Accrington at Molineux Stadium on 14 September 1891. The penalty was taken and scored by Billy Heath as Wolves went on to win the game 5–0.

=== Subsequent developments ===
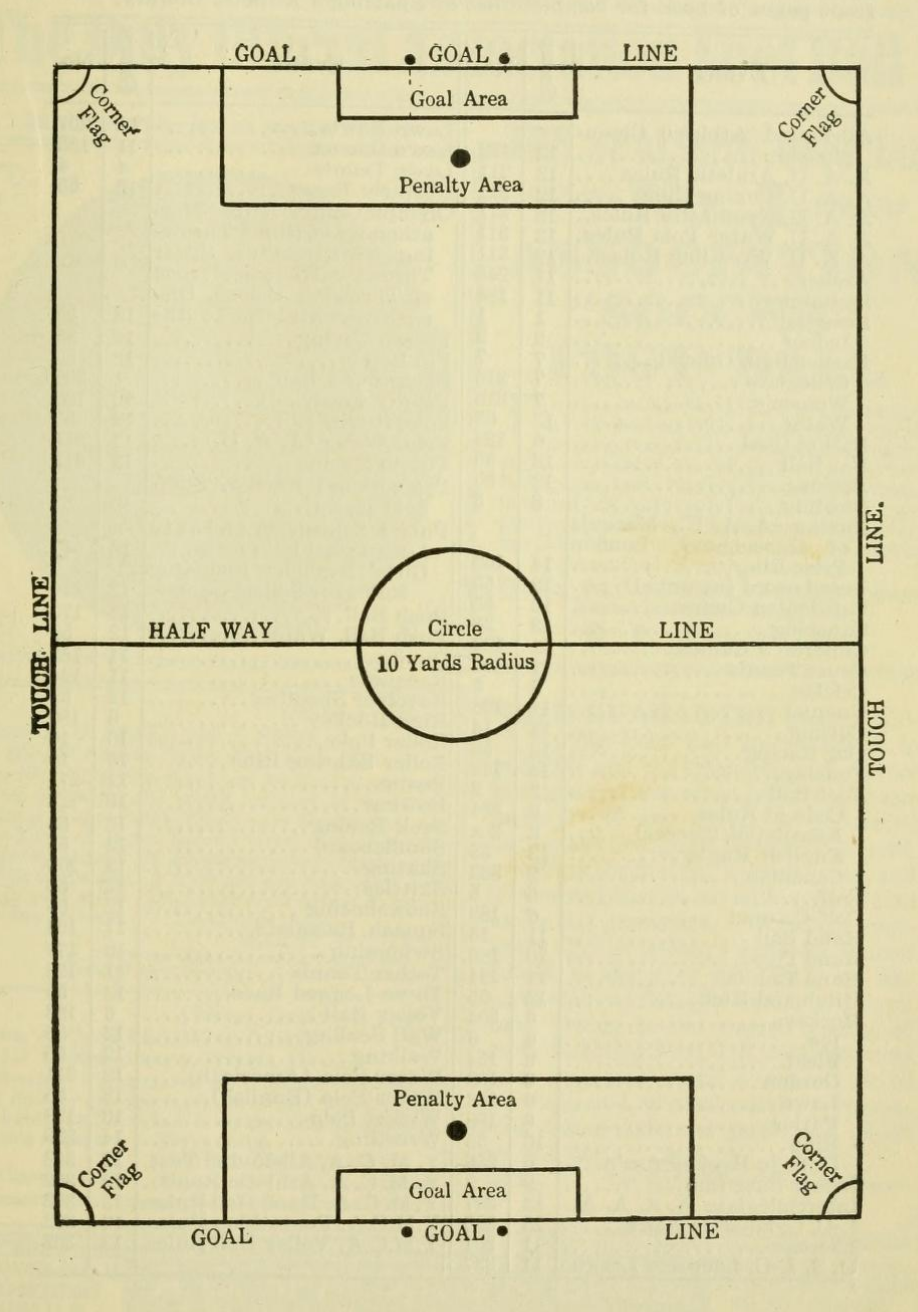
The laws of 1902 introduced the modern penalty area and the penalty spot

In 1892, the player taking the penalty-kick was forbidden to kick the ball again before the ball had touched another player. A provision was also added that "[i]f necessary, time of play shall be extended to admit of the penalty kick being taken".

In 1896, the ball was required to be kicked forward, and the requirement for an appeal was removed.

In 1902, the penalty area was introduced with its current dimensions (a rectangle extending 18 yards (16 m) from the goal-posts). The penalty spot was also introduced, 12 yards (11 m) from the goal. All other players were required to be outside the penalty area.

In 1905, the goalkeeper was required to remain on the goal-line.

In 1923, all other players were required to be at least 10 yards (9.15 m) from the penalty-spot (in addition to being outside the penalty-area). This change was made in order to stop defenders from lining up on the edge of the penalty area to impede the player taking the kick.

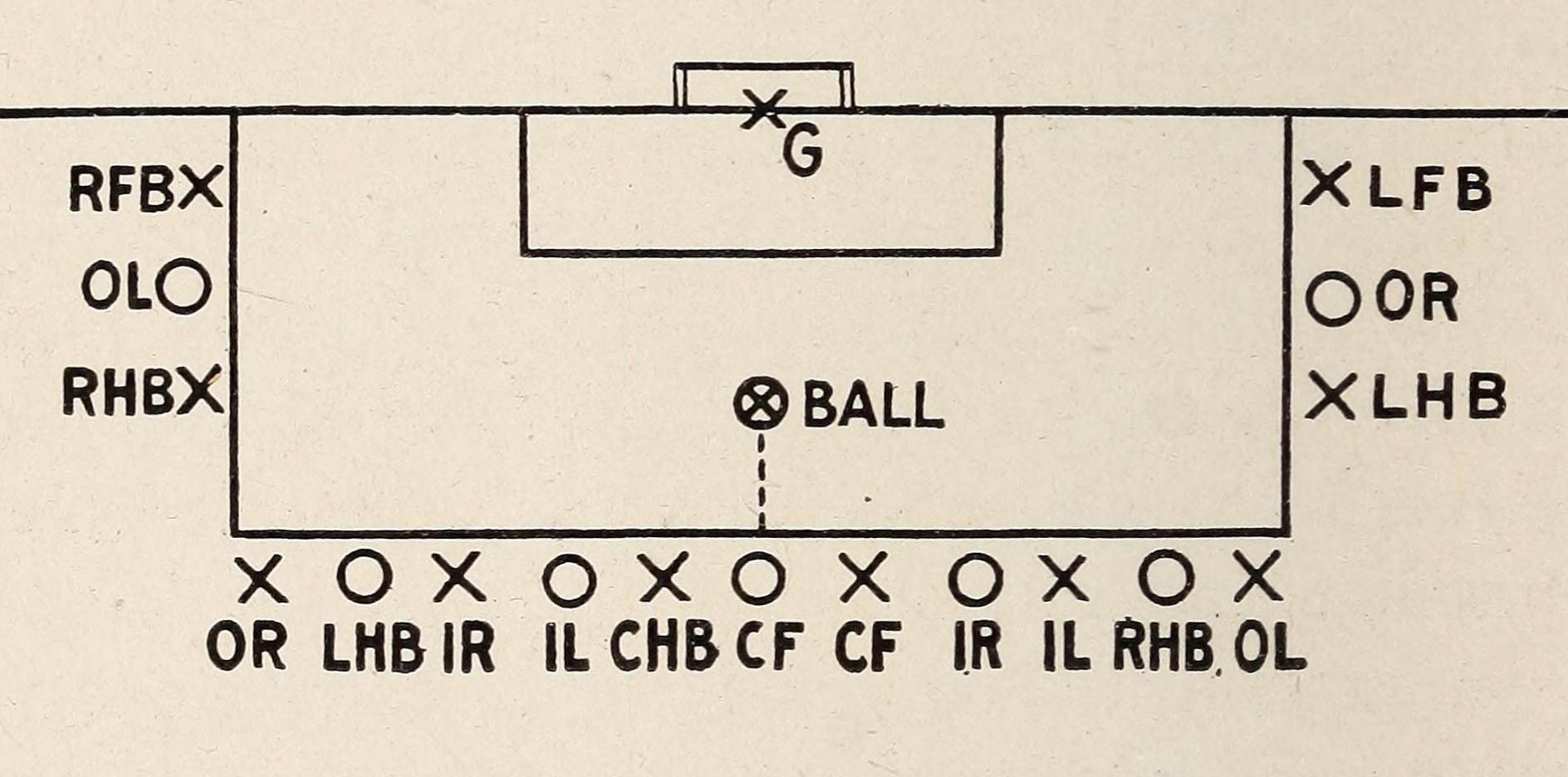
Suggested "disposition of players at penalty kick" (1923), reflecting the pre-1923 laws

In 1930, a footnote was appended to the laws, stating that "the goal-keeper must not move his feet until the penalty kick has been taken".

In 1937, an arc (colloquially known as the "D") was added to the pitch markings, to assist in the enforcement of the 10-yard (9.15 m) restriction. The goalkeeper was required to stand between the goal-posts.

In 1939, it was specified that the ball must travel the distance of its circumference before being in play. In 1997, this requirement was eliminated: the ball became in play as soon as it was kicked and moved forward. In 2016, it was specified that the ball must "clearly" move.

Feinting during the run-up to a penalty was popularised by Pelé in the 1970s and it was called paradinha, which in Portuguese means "little stop". It has occupied the International FA Board since 1982, when it was decided that "if a player stops in his run-up it is an offence for which he shall be cautioned (for ungentlemanly conduct) by the referee". However, in 1985 the same body reversed itself, deciding that the "assumption that feigning was an offence" was "wrong", and that it was up to the referee to decide whether any instance should be penalised as ungentlemanly conduct. From 2000 to 2006, documents produced by IFAB specified that feinting during the run-up to a penalty-kick was permitted. In 2007, this guidance emphasised that "if in the opinion of the referee the feinting is considered an act of unsporting behaviour, the player shall be cautioned". In 2010, because of concern over "an increasing trend in players feinting a penalty kick to deceive the goalkeeper", a proposal was adopted to specify that while "feinting in the run-up to take a penalty kick to confuse opponents is permitted as part of football", "feinting to kick the ball once the player has completed his run-up is considered an infringement of Law 14 and an act of unsporting behaviour for which the player must be cautioned".

In 1995, all other players were required to remain behind the penalty spot. The Scottish Football Association claimed that this new provision would "eliminate various problems which have arisen regarding the position of players who stand in front of the penalty-mark at the taking of a penalty-kick as is presently permitted".

The rule requiring the goalkeeper to stand on the goal line before the kick have been routinely violated in practice. 2002 analysis of 129 penalties taken in the World Cup and European Champions League shoot-outs showed that the goalkeepers moved from the goal line in 80% of cases. In 1997, the rule was changed to allow movement along the goal line.

In 2016, fouls off the field of play were made punishable by a penalty kick if the nearest point is inside the offender's penalty area. The rules specified the infringements by the attacking team which should not be followed by retaking the penalty kick: feinting the kick after the run-up and a kick by a team-mate of the identified kicker were made cautionable offences, which, along with kicking the ball backwards, were to be followed by an indirect free kick. The rules also required a yellow card for an infringement by the defending goalkeeper. Before the Euro 2016 knockout stage, UEFA's refereeing chief Pierluigi Collina emphasised the need to punish goalkeepers for encroachment. He highlighted the incorrect decision of Björn Kuipers, who allowed the Croatian goalkeeper to advance from the goal line before saving the penalty kick in the group stage match against Spain.

Video assistant referee protocol was written into the Laws of the Game in 2018, making the penalty kick decisions subject for review "in the event of a 'clear and obvious error' or 'serious missed incident'". In June 2019, a looser definition of encroachment by the goalkeepers was introduced along with stricter enforcement of the rule. Goalkeepers were required to have at least part of one foot in line with the goal line when the ball is kicked from the penalty spot.

The new encroachment rules came into effect just before the start of the 2019 Women's World Cup. During the group stage of the tournament, three VAR reviews resulted in penalties retaken and goalkeepers booked for moving off their line. IFAB subsequently agreed to suspend cautioning the goalkeepers for encroachment during the penalty shoot-outs due to risk of a send-off. In August, IFAB additionally clarified that a penalty kick should not be retaken if the goalkeeper's encroachment did not clearly affect the kicker. This was written into the Laws of the Game in 2020, and the goalkeeper was to be warned for the first encroachment offence instead of being cautioned.

In March 2025, the video assistant referee ruled in a Champions League shootout that a kick by Julián Alvarez counted as a miss due to a double touch: Alvarez' standing foot had skidded and grazed the ball as he kicked it. UEFA queried this rationale with IFAB, which issued a "clarification" at its June 2025 meeting that such an accidental double touch should not count as an attacker infringement; instead, the penalty kick should be retaken.

=== Summary ===
Date	Location of offence	Location of penalty-kick	Position of goalkeeper	Position of other players	Goalkeeper may move feet	Taker may kick ball twice	Ball may be kicked backward	Kicker may feint	Date
1891	Within 12 yards (11 m) of the goal-line	From any point 12 yards (11 m) from the goal-line	Within 6 yards (5.5 m) of the goal-line	At least 6 yards (5.5 m) behind the ball	Yes	Yes	Yes	Unless considered ungentlemanly behaviour	1891
1892	Within 12 yards (11 m) of the goal-line	From any point 12 yards (11 m) from the goal-line	Within 6 yards (5.5 m) of the goal-line	At least 6 yards (5.5 m) behind the ball	Yes	No	Yes	Unless considered ungentlemanly behaviour	1892
1896	Within 12 yards (11 m) of the goal-line	From any point 12 yards (11 m) from the goal-line	Within 6 yards (5.5 m) of the goal-line	At least 6 yards (5.5 m) behind the ball	Yes	No	No	Unless considered ungentlemanly behaviour	1896
1902	Within the penalty area	From the penalty spot	Within the goal area	Outside the penalty area	Yes	No	No	Unless considered ungentlemanly behaviour	1902
1905	Within the penalty area	From the penalty spot	On the goal line	Outside the penalty area	Yes	No	No	Unless considered ungentlemanly behaviour	1905
1923	Within the penalty area	From the penalty spot	On the goal line	Outside the penalty area, and at least 10 yards (9.15 m) from the ball	Yes	No	No	Unless considered ungentlemanly behaviour	1923
1930	Within the penalty area	From the penalty spot	On the goal line	Outside the penalty area, and at least 10 yards (9.15 m) from the ball	No	No	No	Unless considered ungentlemanly behaviour	1930
1937	Within the penalty area	From the penalty spot	On the goal line	Outside the penalty area, and at least 10 yards (9.15 m) from the ball	No	No	No	Unless considered ungentlemanly behaviour	1937
1982	Within the penalty area	From the penalty spot	On the goal line	Outside the penalty area, and at least 10 yards (9.15 m) from the ball	No	No	No	No	1982
1985	Within the penalty area	From the penalty spot	On the goal line	Outside the penalty area, and at least 10 yards (9.15 m) from the ball	No	No	No	Unless considered ungentlemanly / unsporting behaviour	1985
1995	Within the penalty area	From the penalty spot	On the goal line	Outside the penalty area, at least 10 yards (9.15 m) from the ball, and behind the ball	No	No	No	Unless considered ungentlemanly / unsporting behaviour	1995
1997	Within the penalty area	From the penalty spot	On the goal line	Outside the penalty area, at least 10 yards (9.15 m) from the ball, and behind the ball	Yes	No	No	Unless considered ungentlemanly / unsporting behaviour	1997
2010	Within the penalty area	From the penalty spot	On the goal line	Outside the penalty area, at least 10 yards (9.15 m) from the ball, and behind the ball	Yes	No	No	Unless the run-up is complete	2010
2025	Within the penalty area	From the penalty spot	On the goal line	Outside the penalty area, at least 10 yards (9.15 m) from the ball, and behind the ball	Yes	Not intentionally	No	Unless the run-up is complete	2025

=== Offences for which a penalty kick was awarded ===
Since its introduction in 1891, a penalty kick has been awarded for two broad categories of offences:

- handball
- serious offences involving physical contact

The number of offences eligible for punishment by a penalty-kick, small when initially introduced in 1891, expanded rapidly thereafter. This led to some confusion: for example, in September 1891, a referee awarded a penalty kick against a goalkeeper who "[lost] his temper and [kicked] an opponent", even though under the 1891 laws this offence was punishable only by an indirect free-kick.

The table below shows the punishments specified by the laws for offences involving handling the ball or physical contact, between 1890 and 1903:

Date	Handball	Tripping	Pushing	Holding	Kicking a player	Jumping at a player	Charging from behind	Technical handling violations by the goalkeeper	Dangerous play	Date
1890	Indirect free-kick	Indirect free-kick	Indirect free-kick	Indirect free-kick	Indirect free-kick	Indirect free-kick	Indirect free-kick	Indirect free-kick	Not prohibited	1890
1891	Indirect free-kick / Penalty-kick	Indirect free-kick / Penalty-kick	Indirect free-kick	Indirect free-kick / Penalty-kick	Indirect free-kick	Indirect free-kick	Indirect free-kick	Indirect free-kick	Not prohibited	1891
1893	Indirect free-kick / Penalty-kick	Indirect free-kick / Penalty-kick	Indirect free-kick / Penalty-kick	Indirect free-kick / Penalty-kick	Indirect free-kick	Indirect free-kick	Indirect free-kick	Indirect free-kick	Indirect free-kick	1893
1897	Indirect free-kick / Penalty-kick	Indirect free-kick / Penalty-kick	Indirect free-kick / Penalty-kick	Indirect free-kick / Penalty-kick	Indirect free-kick	Indirect free-kick	Indirect free-kick / Penalty-kick	Indirect free-kick	Indirect free-kick	1897
1901	Indirect free-kick / Penalty-kick	Indirect free-kick / Penalty-kick	Indirect free-kick / Penalty-kick	Indirect free-kick / Penalty-kick	Indirect free-kick / Penalty-kick	Indirect free-kick	Indirect free-kick / Penalty-kick	Indirect free-kick	Indirect free-kick	1901
1902	Indirect free-kick / Penalty-kick	Indirect free-kick / Penalty-kick	Indirect free-kick / Penalty-kick	Indirect free-kick / Penalty-kick	Indirect free-kick / Penalty-kick	Indirect free-kick / Penalty-kick	Indirect free-kick / Penalty-kick	Indirect free-kick	Indirect free-kick	1902
1903	Direct free-kick / Penalty-kick	Direct free-kick / Penalty-kick	Direct free-kick / Penalty-kick	Direct free-kick / Penalty-kick	Direct free-kick / Penalty-kick	Direct free-kick / Penalty-kick	Direct free-kick / Penalty-kick	Indirect free-kick	Indirect free-kick	1903

Since 1903, the offences for which a penalty kick is awarded within the defending team's penalty area have been identical to those for which a direct free kick is awarded outside the defending team's penalty area. These consisted of handball (excluding technical handling offences by the goalkeeper), and foul play, with the following exceptions (which were punished instead by an indirect free kick in the penalty area):

- Dangerous play (since 1903)
- Obstructing / impeding the progress of an opponent (1951–2016) and impeding an opponent without contact (from 2016)
- Charging when not attempting to play the ball (1948–1997)

== See also ==
- Penalty shoot-out (association football)
- Panenka (penalty kick)
