= Milford F.C. =

- Full name: Milford Football Club
- Founded: 1885
- Dissolved: 1897?
- Ground: Milford
- League: Irish Football League
Home colours

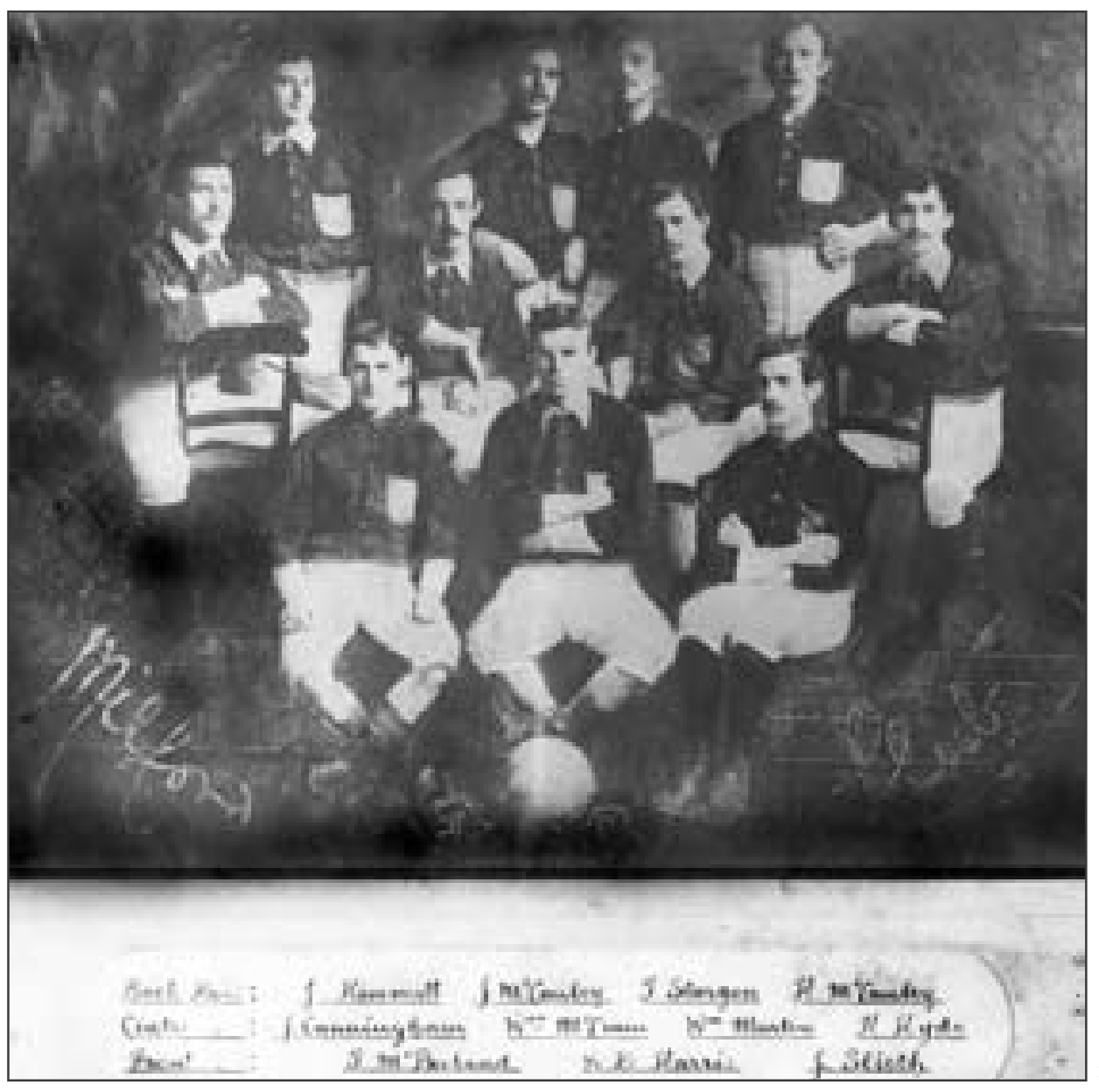
Milford Football Club, 1888-89

Milford Football Club was an Irish football club based in the village of Milford, County Armagh.

== History ==
The club was founded in 1885, joining the Irish Football Association in 1886 and won the inaugural Mid-Ulster Cup in 1887–88 with a 3–1 win over Loughgall.

The club was subsequently a founding member of the Irish Football League in 1890, but retained membership only for one season. It continued in at a junior level in the Midland League until 1896.

The club is most notable for being the place where the penalty kick was first introduced in 1890, when local goalkeeper William McCrum suggested a way to combat illegal challenges near to goal.

== Colours ==
The club played in royal blue.

== Honours ==
=== Senior honours ===
- Mid-Ulster Cup: 2
  - 1887–88, 1888–89
