= Bedford Block =

- Bedford Building
- U.S. National Register of Historic Places
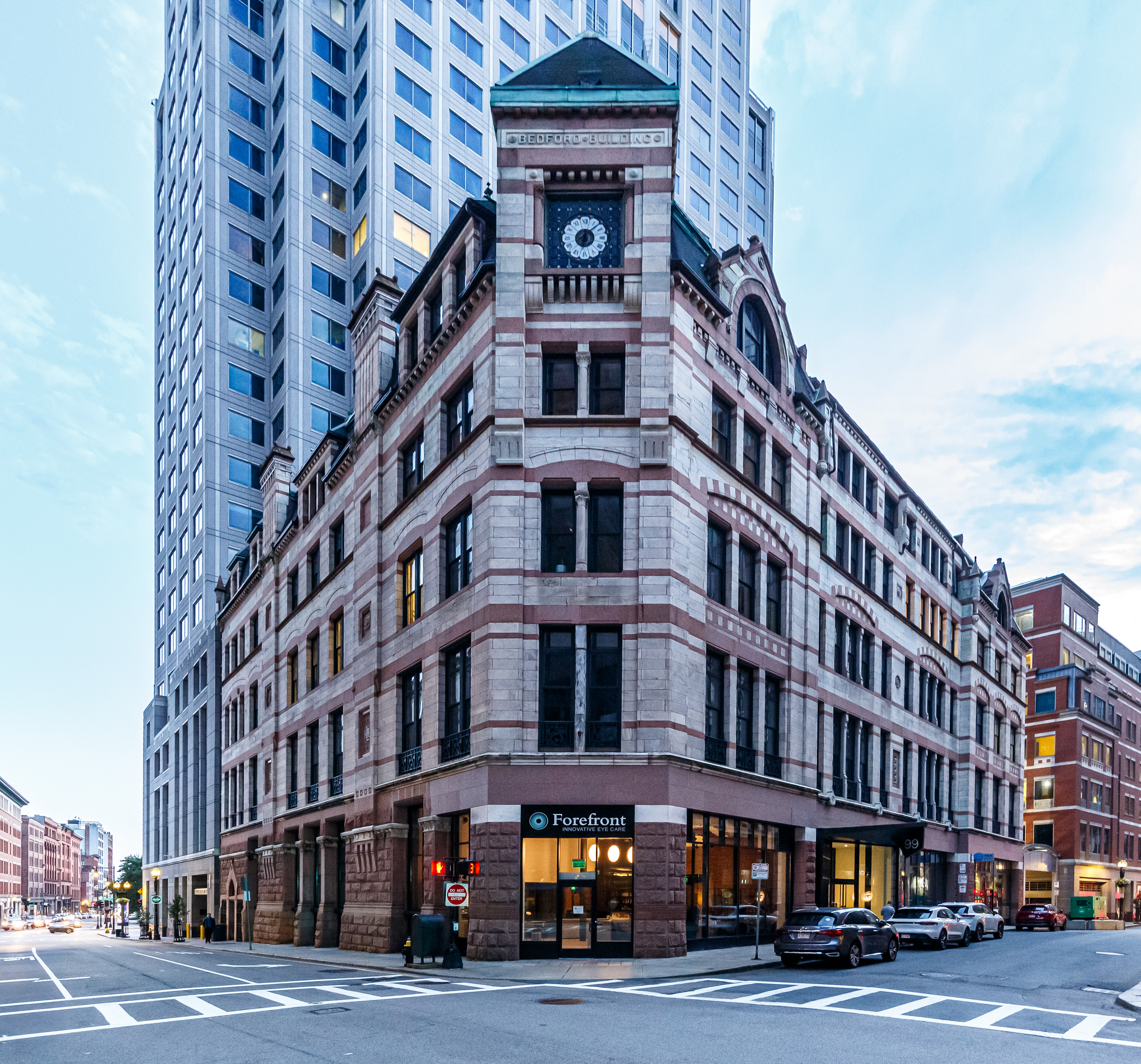

- Location within Boston Location within Massachusetts Location within the United States
- Location: 99 Bedford St., Boston, Massachusetts
- Coordinates: 42°21′11.44″N 71°3′29.04″W
- Area: less than one acre
- Built: 1875
- Architect: Charles Amos Cummings; Willard T. Sears
- Architectural style: Venetian Gothic
- NRHP reference No.: 79000368
- Added to NRHP: August 21, 1979

The Bedford Block or Bedford Building is an historic commercial building at 99 Bedford Street Boston, Massachusetts, in an area called Church Green. Built in 1875 to a design by Charles Amos Cummings and Willard T. Sears, it is a rare local example of a style promoted by John Ruskin called Venetian Gothic. The building was added to the National Historic Register in 1979.

== Description and history ==
The Bedford Block is located in the southern part of Boston's downtown, at the northeast corner of Bedford and Lincoln Streets facing the triangular intersection known as Church Green. The Bedford Block's exterior is constructed of polychromatic bands of New Brunswick red granite, Tuckahoen marble, and pressed terra-cotta panels manufactured in Philadelphia, Pennsylvania. It was the first building after the Great Fire to use New Brunswick red granite as a material.

The first floor features rough rustic blocks. Upper floor details include arched bay windows, Viollet-le-Duc inspired iron balconets and flat column pilasters. Each roof gable is topped with a finial crown. There is a glazed tile clock is located in a 5-story tower at the northeast corner.

The building was designed by Charles Amos Cummings and Willard T. Sears for Henry and Francis Lee as a retail shoe center in an area that had been destroyed by the Great Boston Fire of 1872. It included fire-prevention features added to Boston's building codes in the wake of the fire, including fire blocking internal brick walls.

The building was renovated in 1983 in conjunction with the Bay-Bedford Company.

== See also ==
- National Register of Historic Places listings in northern Boston, Massachusetts
