= Seapatrick F.C. =

Association football club in Northern Ireland

Seapatrick
- Full name: Seapatrick Football Club
- Nickname: The Village
- Founded: 1947
- Ground: Havelock Park; Seapatrick, County Down
- League: Mid-Ulster Football League Intermediate B

Seapatrick Football Club is an intermediate-level football club playing in the Intermediate B division of the Mid-Ulster Football League in Northern Ireland. The club forms part of the Mid-Ulster Football Association.

== Honours ==
=== Senior honours ===
- Mid-Ulster Cup (3): 1950–51, 1951–52, 1954–55
- Mid-Ulster Shield (1): 1988–89 (beating Lurgan Institute 2–1)
