= Milford, County Armagh =

Village in County Armagh, Northern Ireland

Coordinates: 54.334°N 6.684°W

Baltarran Road in Milford

Milford or Millford is a small village about one mile southwest of Armagh in County Armagh, Northern Ireland. It is within the Armagh City and District Council area. It had a population of 569 people (215 households) in the 2011 Census. (2001 Census: 301 people)

== Name ==
The village is mostly within the townland of Kennedies, which was historically called Kennedus (1657) and Ballycennadus (1609). This may be derived from Irish Ceannanus, meaning 'headquarters'. The name Milford or Millford comes from a large corn mill, the remains of which stand on Maggy's Burn at the bottom of the steep main street of the village.

== History ==
It was the linen industry of the 19th century, which resulted in Milford growing up around the mill built on the River Callan by William McCrum in 1808. In the 20th century, a decline in the overall importance of the linen industry led to economic stagnation of this once thriving community, where the mill was the main source of local employment. The mill closed in the 1980s.

== Sport ==
William McCrum who inherited the village from his father also founded Milford Cricket Club and Milford Football Club for the benefit of himself and his workers. His lasting legacy was the invention of the penalty kick which was adopted by the Irish Football Association at its 1889 meeting on McCrum's proposal and introduced throughout football in 1890.

Until recent years the village of Milford consisted of three streets of terraced houses but in modern times several new housing estates have been built. In the summer of 2005 another estate is being built on one of a number of fields which is locally believed to have been the site of the original football pitch where Mr McCrum had some of his workforce practice the original penalty kicks.

== Transport ==
- Milford railway station opened on 1 October 1909 and finally closed on 1 February 1932.

== Education ==
- Aghavilly Primary School

== Demography ==
=== 2011 Census ===
On Census day (27 March 2011) there were 618 people living in Milford.

- 21.5% belong to or were brought up in a 'Protestant and Other Christian (including Christian related)' religion and 74.8% belong to or were brought up in the Catholic religion;

== See also ==
- List of villages in Northern Ireland
- List of towns in Northern Ireland
