= Scanning flow cell =

Electrochemical technique

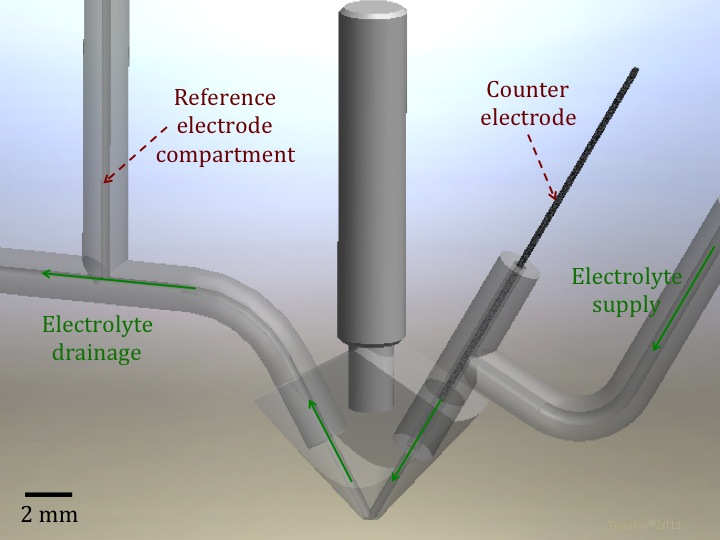
CAD model of the Scanning Flow Cell including spatial distribution of the electrodes

Scanning Flow Cell (SFC) is an electrochemical technique, based on the principle of the channel electrode. In an SFC, electrolyte is continuously flowing over a small polycarbonate block which contains two intersecting channels that form an elliptical opening.

SFC utilizes V-formed geometry with a small opening on the bottom (in range of 0.2-1mm diameter) used to establish the contact with sample. The convective flow is sustained also in the non-contact mode of operation that allows easy exchange of the working electrode.

== Application ==
The SFC is employed for combinatorial and high-throughput electrochemical studies. Due to its non-homogenous flow profile distribution, it is currently used for comparative kinetic studies. SFC is predominantly used for coupling of electrochemical measurements with post analytical techniques like UV-Vis, ICP-MS, ICP-OES etc. This makes possible a direct correlation of electrochemical and spectrometric signal. This methodology was successfully applied for corrosion studies.
