= Specific fuel consumption =

Specific fuel consumption may refer to:

- Brake-specific fuel consumption, fuel efficiency within a shaft engine
- Thrust-specific fuel consumption, fuel efficiency of an engine design with respect to thrust output
