= COVID-19 pandemic in Northern Ireland =

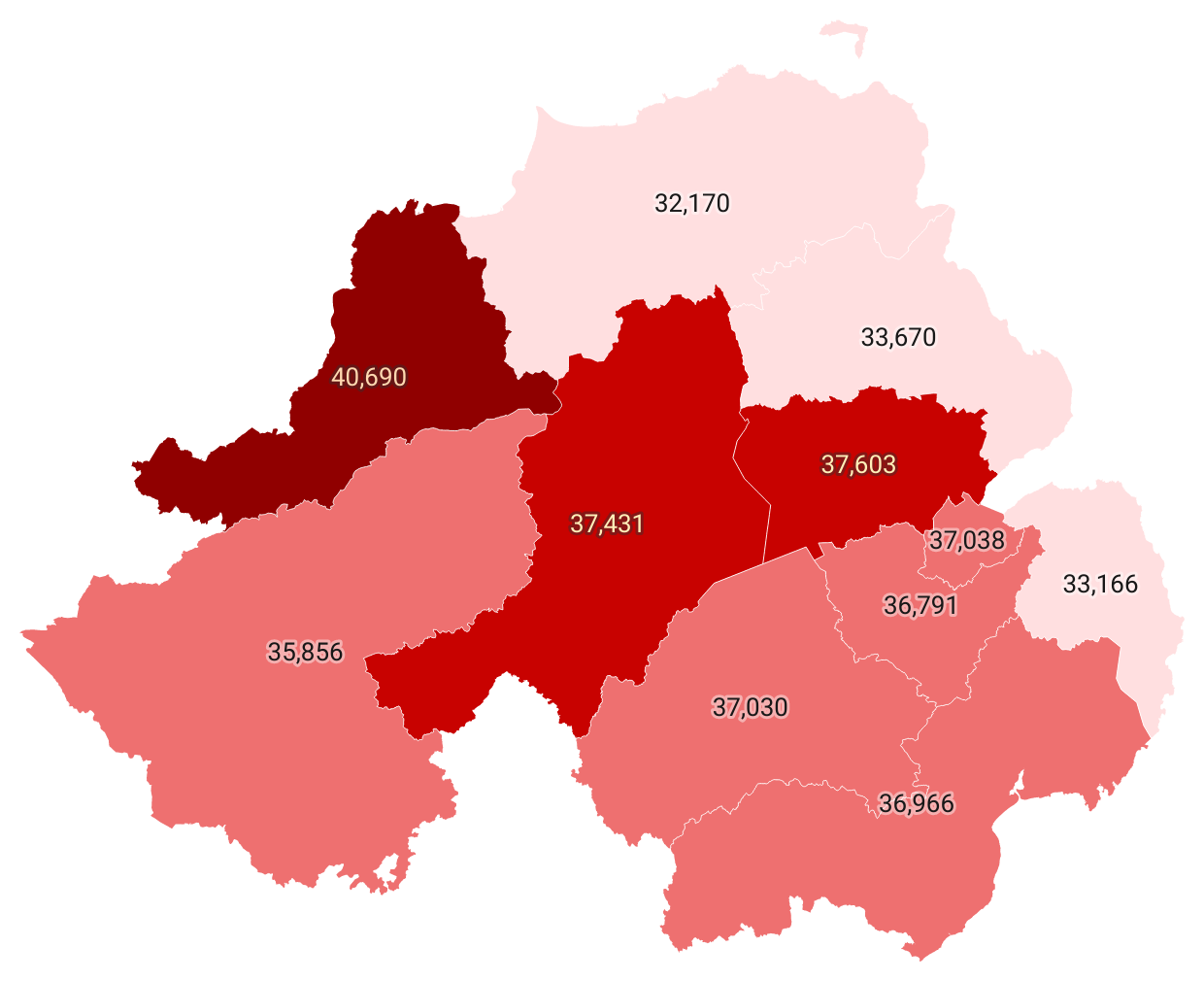
- Cumulative cases per 100,000 residents by LGD, as of midnight 13 April 2022. <33,874 33,874–35,578 35,578–37,282 37,282–38,986 ≥38,986
- Disease: COVID-19
- Pathogen: SARS-CoV-2
- Location: Northern Ireland, United Kingdom
- First outbreak: Wuhan, Hubei, China
- Index case: Belfast
- Arrival date: 27 February 2020 (6 years, 7 months and 4 weeks)
- Confirmed cases: 713,294 (as of 20 May 2022)
- Deaths: 3,445 (Department of Health); 5,325 (NISRA) (as of 23 June 2023)
- Fatality rate: 1.87% (DOH) 2.46% (NISRA)

Government website
- Northern Ireland Department of Health

The COVID-19 pandemic reached Northern Ireland in February 2020. Northern Ireland has the lowest COVID death rate per population in the United Kingdom. Covid statistics were very available at the start of the pandemic. The vast majority of deaths were among those over the age of 60 and almost half were in care homes.

On 23 March 2020, Northern Ireland went into lockdown with the rest of the UK. A stay-at-home order banned "non-essential" travel and contact with others, and schools, businesses, venues, amenities and places of worship were shut. Major events such as Saint Patrick's Day were cancelled. A lengthy lockdown was forecast to severely damage the economy and lead to a large rise in unemployment. The health service worked to raise hospital capacity. In mid-April, Department of Health modeling indicated the health service in Northern Ireland could cope with the expected peak in cases. On 21 April, Northern Ireland's chief scientific advisor said the curve of new cases had flattened, and the peak had passed.

The lockdown was gradually lifted in June–July, as infection and death rates dropped. Schools remained closed for summer break, but re-opened in September. The infection rate (or positivity rate) rose again that month and restrictions were re-imposed. On 16 October, Northern Ireland went into an eight-week lockdown, although schools remained open, and some restrictions were eased for one week. The lockdown was mostly lifted on 11 December. Following a brief easing of restrictions at Christmas, another lockdown was imposed on 26 December, including schools, as the positivity rate rose sharply. A mass vaccination program began, and the infection rate fell in early 2021. Schools re-opened in March, and the lockdown was gradually lifted from late April. In December, proof of vaccination or non-infection became mandatory to enter indoor venues. The Northern Ireland Statistics and Research Agency reported 5,325 where the death certificate mentioned COVID as one possible cause (see Statistics), as of June 2023.

== Timeline ==
Health care in the United Kingdom is devolved, with England, Northern Ireland, Scotland and Wales each having their own publicly funded healthcare systems, funded by devolved block grants via the Barnett formula and accountable to separate governments and parliaments, together with smaller private sector and voluntary provision. As a result of each country having different policies and priorities, differences now exist between these systems.

=== First wave and national lockdown (March–May 2020) ===
The HSC began testing for COVID-19 during February 2020, as of 19 February there were 35 completed tests all of which returned negative results. On 27 February, the HSC confirmed that the first presumptive case had been discovered in Northern Ireland in a woman who had returned from Italy, the case was sent to the Public Health England reference laboratory where it was confirmed as Northern Ireland's first case on 29 February. Cases continued to rise throughout early March with cases rising to seven by the end of the first week.

On 9 March Belfast City Council voted to cancel the annual St Patrick's Day parade in the city. By the end of the second week the HSC started to advise people showing symptoms to isolate for seven days, cases had also jumped to 45 by 15 March. On St Patrick's Day, parades across all of Northern Ireland had been cancelled as cases reached 52.

On 19 March, Northern Ireland recorded its first death from COVID-19, with cases reaching 77. Reacting to the news, First Minister Arlene Foster said "This is a sad day for Northern Ireland. Our thoughts and prayers are first and foremost with the family and friends of the patient who has died. And we are immeasurably grateful to our health service staff who cared for this person. This is not unexpected news. We knew that this pandemic would inevitably cost precious lives. We cannot stop it. But it is incumbent on all of us to do whatever we can to slow its spread and shield those most vulnerable from the effects of this virus." On 22 March, a second person died from COVID-19, with cases rising to 128.

On 20 March, the UK Government announced measures to further tackle the spread of the virus which included closing bars, restaurants, gyms and many other social venues.

Also on 20 March the UK Government announced a Coronavirus Job Retention Scheme, where it would offer grants to companies to pay 80% of a staff wage each month up to a total of £2,500 per a person, if companies kept staff on their payroll. The scheme would cover three months' wages and would be backdated to the start of March. Later in March the Self Employed Income Support Scheme (SEISS) was announced. The scheme paid a grant worth 80% of self employed profits up to £2,500 each month, on companies whose trading profit was less than £50,000 in the 2018–19 financial year or an average less than £50,000 over the last three financial tax years for those who suffered a loss of income.

Cases confirmed by 20 March were 86 in total.

On 21 March, Northern Ireland suffered its largest increase in new cases to date with 22 new cases confirmed. On 22 March, a second person died from the virus.

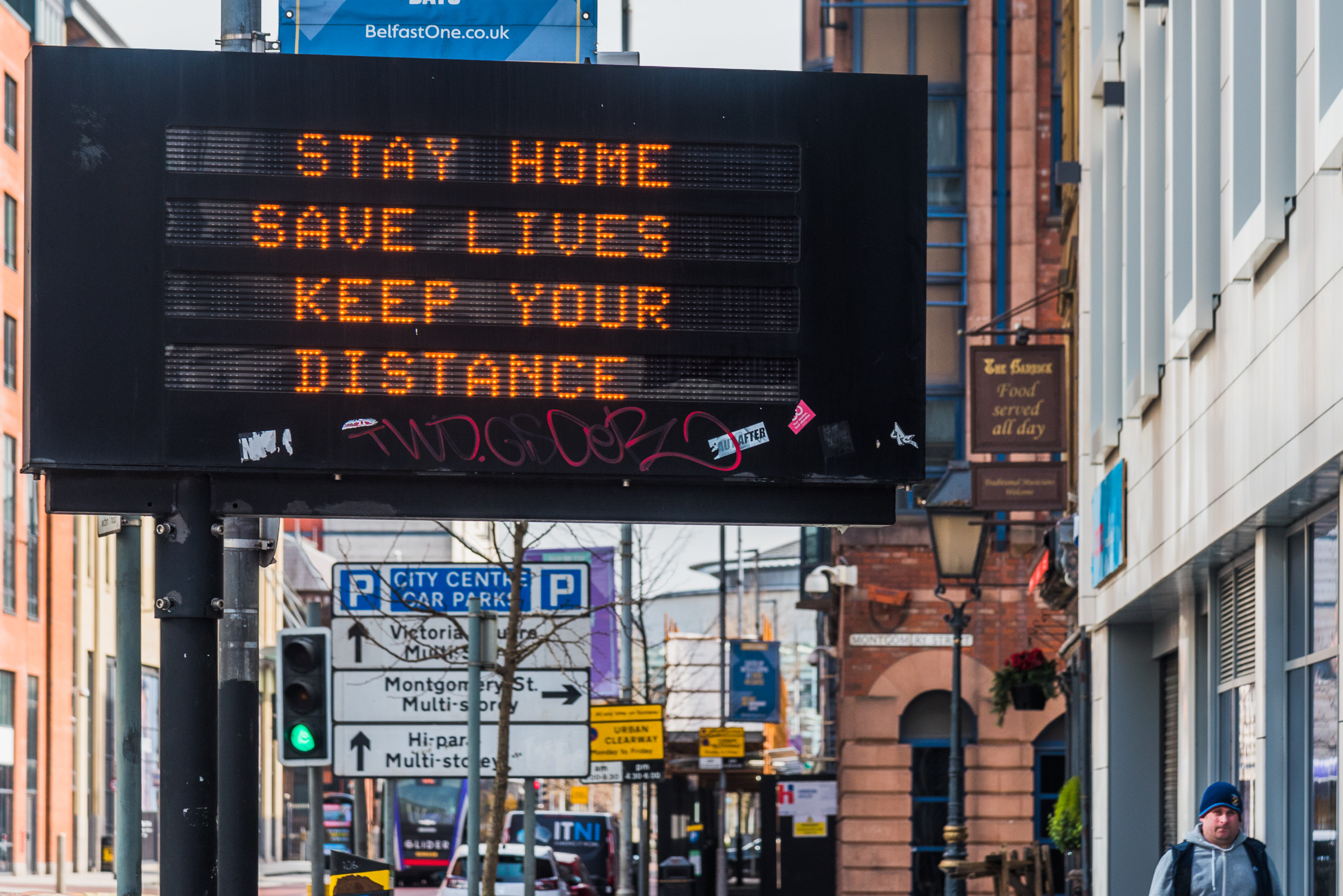
Electronic display sign normally used for traffic management displays COVID-19-related advices on an almost deserted Chichester Street in Belfast City Centre, 24 March.

A third person died from COVID-19 on 23 March, followed by two more deaths on 24 March. On 25 March, the largest increase in new cases to date was recorded as cases rose by 37 to 209, with 2 new deaths also being confirmed. Speaking at a press conference on 25 March, Northern Ireland's Chief Medical Officer Dr Michael McBride said he believes the actual figure of cases to be "many thousands" and testing would increase to approximately 1000 new tests every day.

On 26 March, a further 3 people died from the virus with 32 new confirmed cases. On 27 March, 34 new cases and 3 new deaths were confirmed, with leading GPs in Northern Ireland writing an open letter calling for a complete lockdown, stating "Please hear and act on our heartfelt plea and move to adopt a 'complete lockdown' as we have seen in other countries, at the earliest opportunity. Time is of the essence.". On 28 March, Northern Ireland experienced the highest rate of increased new cases yet with 49 new cases, and a further 2 deaths.

On the evening of 28 March the Northern Ireland Executive announced new stricter measures to combat the spread of the virus. Measures included:

- The ability to force businesses to shut and crack down on people who leave their homes without a "reasonable excuse".
- Penalties, ranging from fixed penalty notices to fines of up to £5,000, are being introduced as enforcement.
- Anyone who can work remotely must do so
- Employers must facilitate remote work where it is feasible
- No employer should compel an employee to come to work if it is feasible to work remotely
- Every employer must take all reasonable steps to safeguard the health, safety and wellbeing of employees during the COVID-19 emergency, whether working remotely or in the workplace
- Every employer must have particular regard to the safety of employees in the workplace and must put into effect the guidance on social distancing issued by the department for the Economy
- Every employer has a legal duty to ensure, so far as it is reasonably practicable, the health, safety and welfare at work of all employees
- Where a business is failing to observe the department for the Economy guidance and breaching the legal duty on health and safety, the statutory authorities will take robust action, which may include prosecution for criminal offences
- Where necessary, the Executive Office will also use its power of direction to close or restrict businesses that do not ensure the safety of their employees.

Commenting on the new measures, Arlene Foster said "We are asking the people of Northern Ireland to make fundamental changes to how they live their lives. But we are doing this to keep you safe, to flatten the curve of the Covid-19 infection so that the health service has the capacity to deal with those who need their help the most." Deputy First Minister Michelle O'Neill also commented "Each one of us has a personal responsibility to do everything we can to fight back against Covid-19 for the good of everyone across society. We will use every power we have to ensure people stay at home so that we save as many lives as we possibly can."

On 29 March, new cases announced by the Public Health Agency were 86 and 6 new deaths, the highest for both in a single day to date.

Following the announcement on 31 March that there were 53 new cases and 6 new deaths, the totals at the end of the month of March were 586 confirmed cases and 28 deaths.

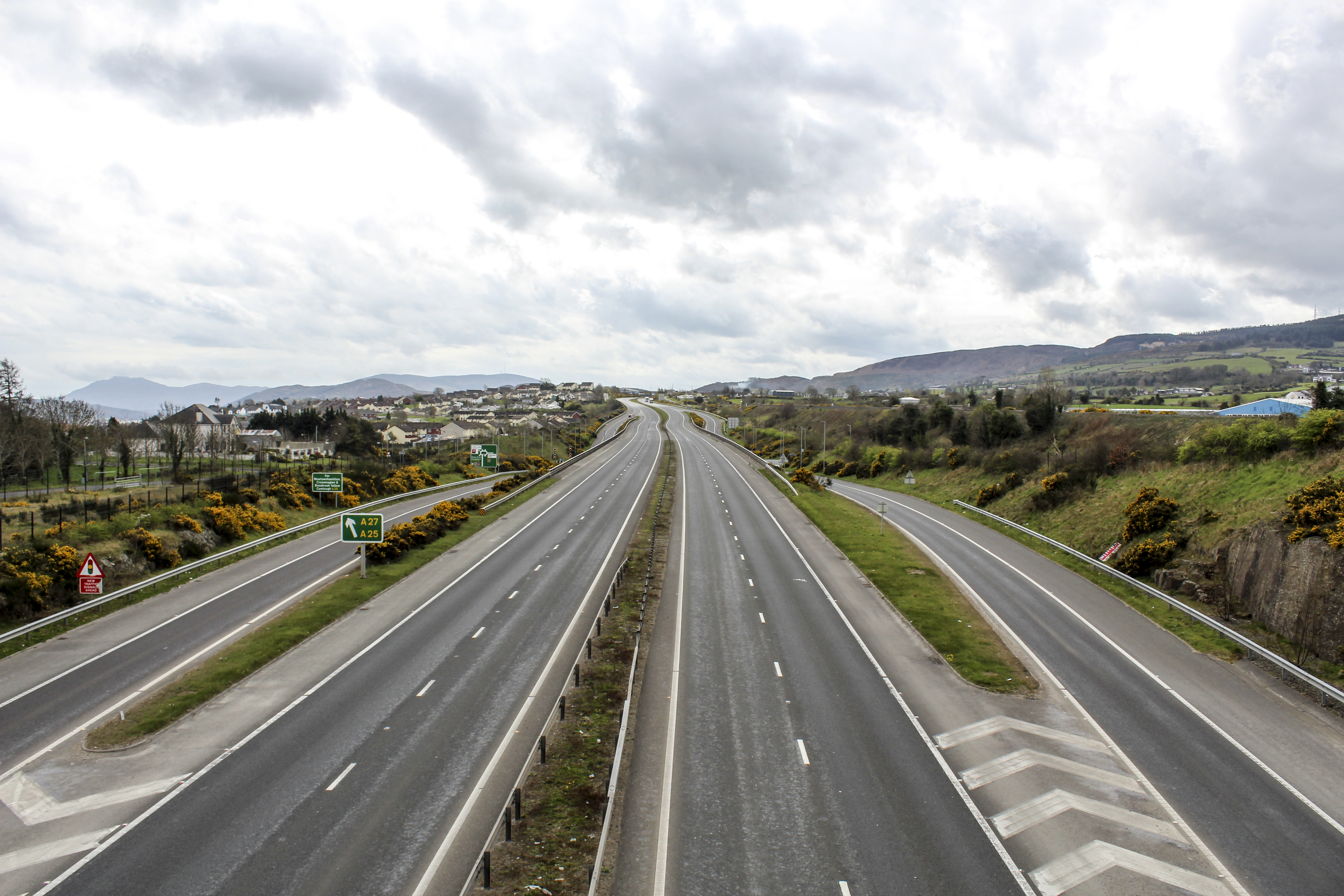
A deserted A1 on the outskirts of Newry during lockdown (4 April 2020)

On 1 April, a further 103 cases and 2 deaths were confirmed as Health Minister Robin Swann warned that 3000 people could die in the first wave of the pandemic. On 2 April, 85 more cases and 6 more deaths were reported, bringing the total number of confirmed cases and deaths to 774 and 36 respectively. On 3 April, the largest increase in deaths and cases to date was published by the Public Health Agency with 130 cases and 12 deaths, bringing the total number of confirmed cases to 904 and the number of deaths to 48.

On 4 April, a further 94 new cases and 8 new deaths were announced, as Northern Ireland's first COVID-19 testing centre for healthcare workers opened at the SSE Arena, Belfast. Health Minister Robin Swann said the new testing facility in Belfast "will allay some of the concern and speculation we have had of late. I fully understand the frustration that we have not been able to scale up testing numbers more quickly. This is not down to a lack of will or action. There are significant challenges including laboratory and staffing capacity and the unprecedented levels of global demand for testing reagents and swabs."

It was reported that more than 33,000 people so far had claimed unemployment benefits since the lockdown began, ten times the normal rate. Economists forecast that a lengthy lockdown and disruption would lead to hundreds of thousands of job losses.

On 5 April, an additional 91 cases and 7 deaths were reported, bringing the total number of cases and deaths to 1,089 and 63 respectively.

On 6 April, the Orange Order announced that the annual 12th July celebrations were cancelled, as a further 69 cases and 7 deaths were confirmed. A further 97 cases and 3 deaths were announced by the Public Health Agency on 7 April, as a second drive-through testing centre opened at a MOT centre in Belfast. With Easter weekend approaching, on 8 April, the Police Service of Northern Ireland warned people against visiting local beauty spots, as the death toll increased to 78 with 5 more deaths and 84 new cases being reported.

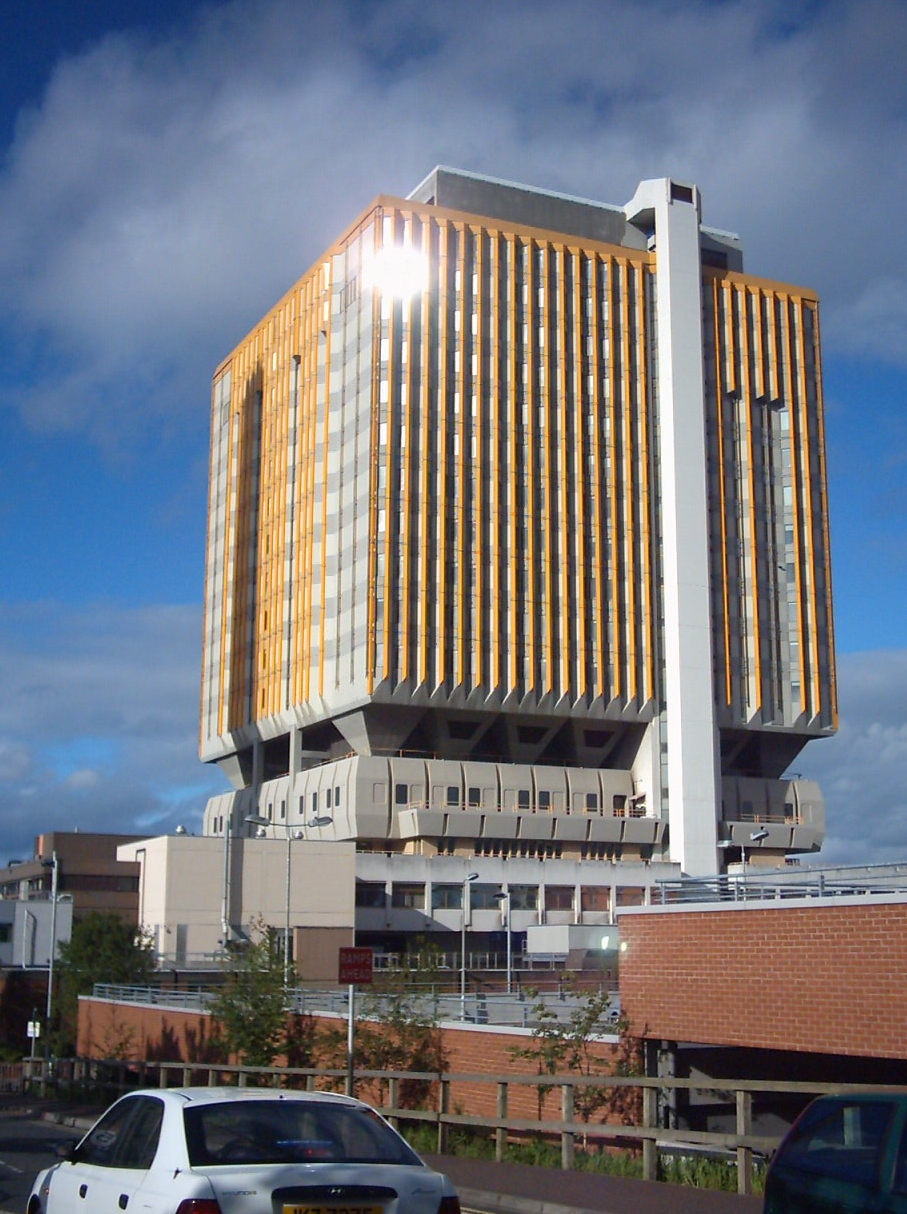
The tower at Belfast City Hospital has been converted to a field hospital.

A further 4 deaths and 138 cases were confirmed on 9 April as experts predicted a deep recession in Northern Ireland following the crisis. Research by the Northern Ireland Assembly Library found that Northern Ireland has a lower COVID-19 death rate per capita than the other countries of the United Kingdom, and a lower death rate than the Republic of Ireland. It was also revealed that Northern Ireland has a higher COVID-19 testing rate per capita than the other countries of the United Kingdom.

On 10 April, a further 10 deaths and 112 cases were reported, bringing the totals to 92 deaths and 1,589 cases.

On 11 April, 15 more deaths and 128 new cases were confirmed as Health Minister Robin Swann called on the Army for assistance in fighting the disease. New cases increased by 89 to 1806, and deaths by 11 to 118 on 12 April. On 15 April, 6 more people died of the virus and another 121 cases were confirmed, as lock-down measures were extended for another three weeks with deputy First Minister Michelle O'Neill warning against complacency stating, "Our biggest danger in this period is complacency. The measures are showing positive results but if we relax our behaviour, we will be in danger."

On 15 April, Arlene Foster, the First Minister of Northern Ireland, extended the period of lockdown in Northern Ireland to 9 May, as 121 new cases and 6 new deaths were confirmed. Modelling by the Department of Health indicated that Northern Ireland had reached the peak of its outbreak, and that the health service in Northern Ireland could now cope with the expected peak in cases. Swann said that the peak "may now, potentially, be less severe than we had feared".

On 20 April, the Department of Health launched a new website that provides daily statistic updates, such as information on hospital admissions and discharges, bed occupancy and a breakdown of case and death numbers by age and gender. Speaking about the launch, Health Minister Robin Swann said, "It is vitally important to keep the public well informed. That includes the publication of statistics, as well as the all-important advice on how we keep ourselves and are loved ones safe." The new website also confirmed that 2,307 COVID-19 patients had been discharged from hospital by 20 April.

On 21 April, Northern Ireland's chief scientific advisor said the rising curve of new cases had flattened in Northern Ireland, and evidence suggests Northern Ireland had passed the peak of its outbreak. He said that the number of cases could fall to a low level by mid-May if social distancing rules are obeyed until then.

On 23 April, the First Minister, Arlene Foster, said Northern Ireland may be able to ease its lockdown sooner than other parts of the UK. She said that easing restrictions will depend when public health criteria are met, rather than on a timetable. The Health Minister said "it's important we take our scientific guidance based on the science that is applicable to Northern Ireland".

As the death toll increased to 338 on 29 April, Health Minister Robin Swann committed to maximum transparency with regards to statistics regarding the COVID-19 outbreak, stating "I want to continue seeing the maximum possible transparency on this issue. I want to explore with NISRA if it is possible for it to report more frequently than once a week on deaths associated with Covid-19 across hospitals and the community. This is not straightforward and I want to thank all those who are working hard in this area to provide up to date and reliable statistics."

Following the announcement on 30 April that there were 73 new cases and 9 new deaths, the totals at the end of the month of April were 3536 confirmed cases and 347 deaths.

On 30 April, the UK Statistics Authority wrote to the Permanent Secretary, Richard Pengelly stating there were gaps in the data and daily time series have been lost since the statistics began to be released through DoH news releases. It was further reported that daily surveillance statistics should be released in a transparent, easily accessible and orderly way.

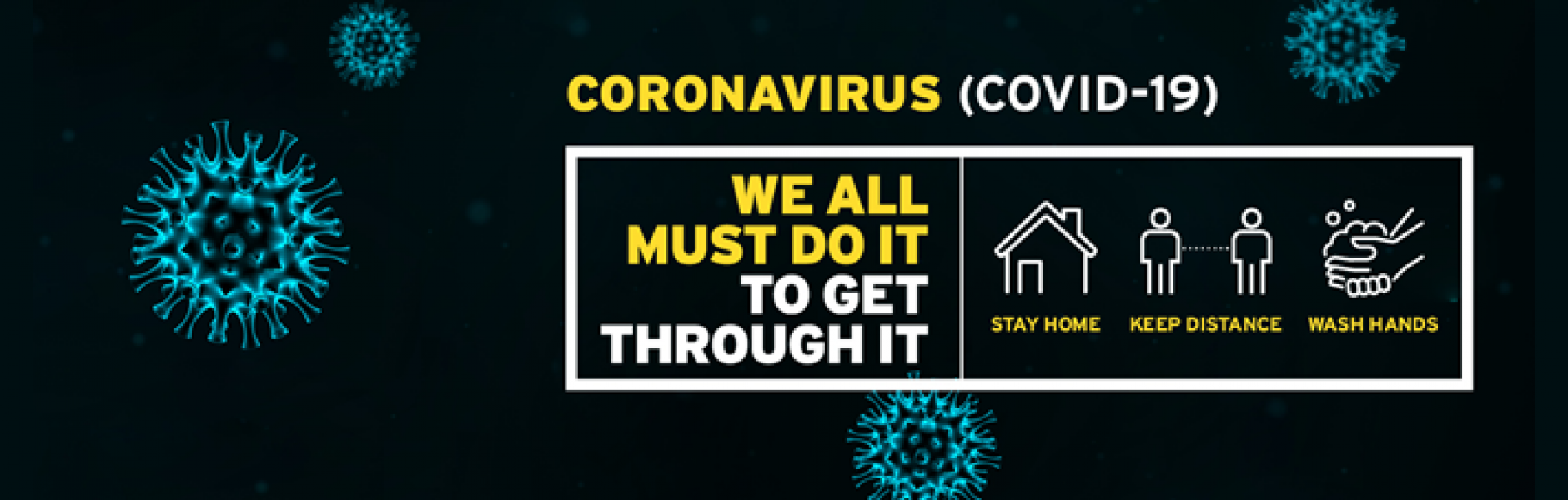
The new slogan "We all must do it to get through it" adopted by the NI Executive in May 2020

On 1 May, a further 18 deaths linked to COVID-19 were announced – 4 of the deaths happened in the past day (from the morning of 30 April until the morning of 1 May). On 5 May fourteen deaths were announced in the same care home in Glengormley, County Antrim.

On 7 May, the Northern Ireland Executive met to discuss a roadmap to ending lockdown restrictions, with an announcement due during the week beginning 11 May. However, despite working on this roadmap, at the time Arlene Foster and Michelle O'Neill warned against easing restrictions in early May as the infection rate was still too high. Ms O'Neill stated, "We're still in the response stage, we're still in the fightback against Covid-19, but we're also in the space where we're planning for the recovery and that's the light at the end of the tunnel that we know everybody wants to be able to see." Based on this evidence, the NI Executive extended the lockdown in Northern Ireland by a further three weeks until 28 May. It was reported that the infection rate is higher in care homes than in the community, which is inflating the overall infection rate.

On 8 May, the Northern Ireland Statistics and Research Agency (NISRA) reported 516 deaths linked to COVID-19 up to and including 1 May. It reported that almost half of the deaths were in care homes and that three-quarters of the deaths were among the over 75s.

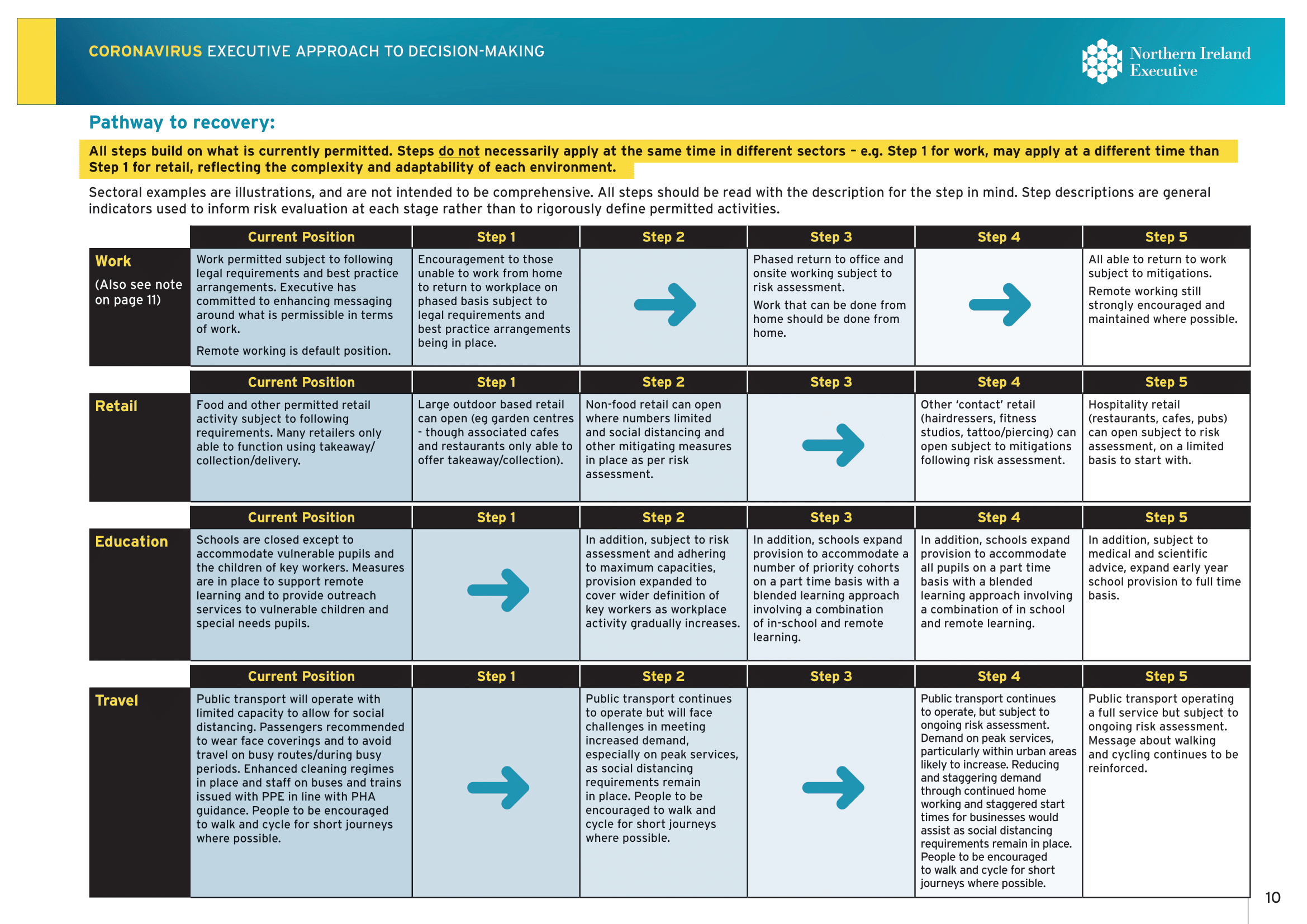
NI Executive roadmap to exiting lockdown, published in May 2020

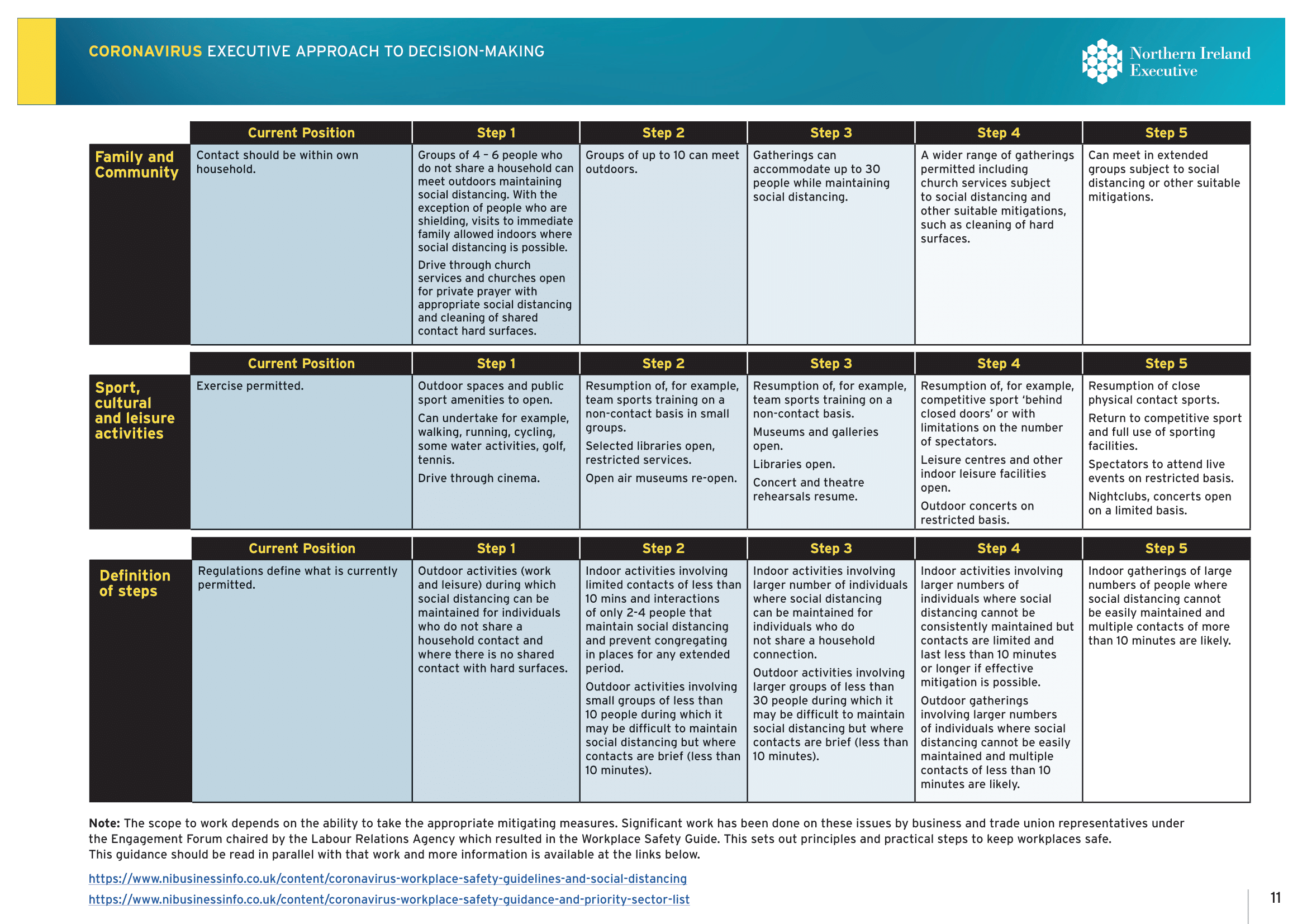
NI Executive roadmap to exiting lockdown, published in May 2020

On 12 May, the Northern Ireland Executive announced a roadmap for Northern Ireland to exit lockdown safely. The plan consists of five stages which are set to start at the end of full lockdown which is expected at the end of May. The plan does not have specific dates as it is fully dependent on how low the R rate is at every stage.

Speaking about the roadmap, First Minister Arlene Foster said: "We recognise how difficult the current restrictions are. But those restrictions, and the determined people of Northern Ireland who have adhered to them, have saved lives and continue to do so. We don't want to keep any restriction in place any longer than we have to, but in relaxing any measure we must be cognisant of the potential effects in the transmission of the virus and our ability to save lives."

The Executive's recovery strategy sets out a pathway for us to emerge from lockdown in the safest way possible. This will require a series of judgements and decisions as we move forward. These decisions will be evidence-based, taking account of our unique circumstances here in Northern Ireland. As we embark on our phased recovery, we will remain focused on the health and wellbeing of our population; the impacts on our society; and our economy as a whole. Above all else, our priority will be saving lives.

Deputy First Minister Michelle O'Neill said:

We don't underestimate the impact that the severe restrictions have had on everyone across our society. While they are still absolutely necessary, it is important that we give people hope for the future. Today we have set out our pathway for future recovery which gives an indication of how the restrictions on different aspects of life may be eased at various stages. The incremental five-step approach reflects the risk-based judgements we will make at each stage. These decisions will be evidenced by medical and scientific advice and benchmarked against our guiding principles and international best practice. The Executive's strategy is not time-bound because it's vital that we retain the flexibility needed to respond to the complex emerging situation based on all relevant evidence. Our recovery from COVID-19 will require a real partnership effort with the community. We are appealing to the public to please be patient. Keep adhering to the restrictions, follow the public health advice and stay at home. We will keep you updated every step of the way when we are in a position to slowly and carefully move out of lockdown.

On 18 May, the Northern Ireland Executive activated some aspects of step one with garden and recycling centres allowed to open. However, on the same day, it was announced that further measures of step one would be activated on Tuesday 19 May such as groups of up to six people who do not share a household being able to meet outside and private church services being allowed.

On 26 May, the Department of Health announced that there were zero deaths in the previous 24 hours, the first time since 18 March. On 29 May NISRA announced that there were 716 deaths from all sources up to 22 May.

At the end of May, there were a total of 4716 confirmed cases of COVID-19 in Northern Ireland with 523 deaths.

=== Easing of restrictions (June–August 2020) ===
Deaths and cases continued to drop at the start of June, as the Health Minister announced an £11.7 million support package for care homes in Northern Ireland, which includes funding for sick pay for staff.

For the first time since lockdown, there were zero deaths recorded from 6 June to 9 June and then from 13 June to 14 June. The Executive announced further easing of lockdown measures with all non-essential retail allowed to reopen from 12 June. The Health Minister also announced a new ID card for support carers which allows them to access stores during priority shopping hours.

On 15 June, the Executive announced more lockdown easing this time focusing on the hospitality industry with hotels, restaurants and bars that sell food or have a large beer garden being allowed to open from 3 July 2020. On 16 June the NI Statistics and Research Agency announced that unemployment in Northern Ireland had doubled between the months of March and May due to COVID-19 restrictions. On 18 June it was announced that from 6 July other services such as hairdressers and barbers are allowed to open.

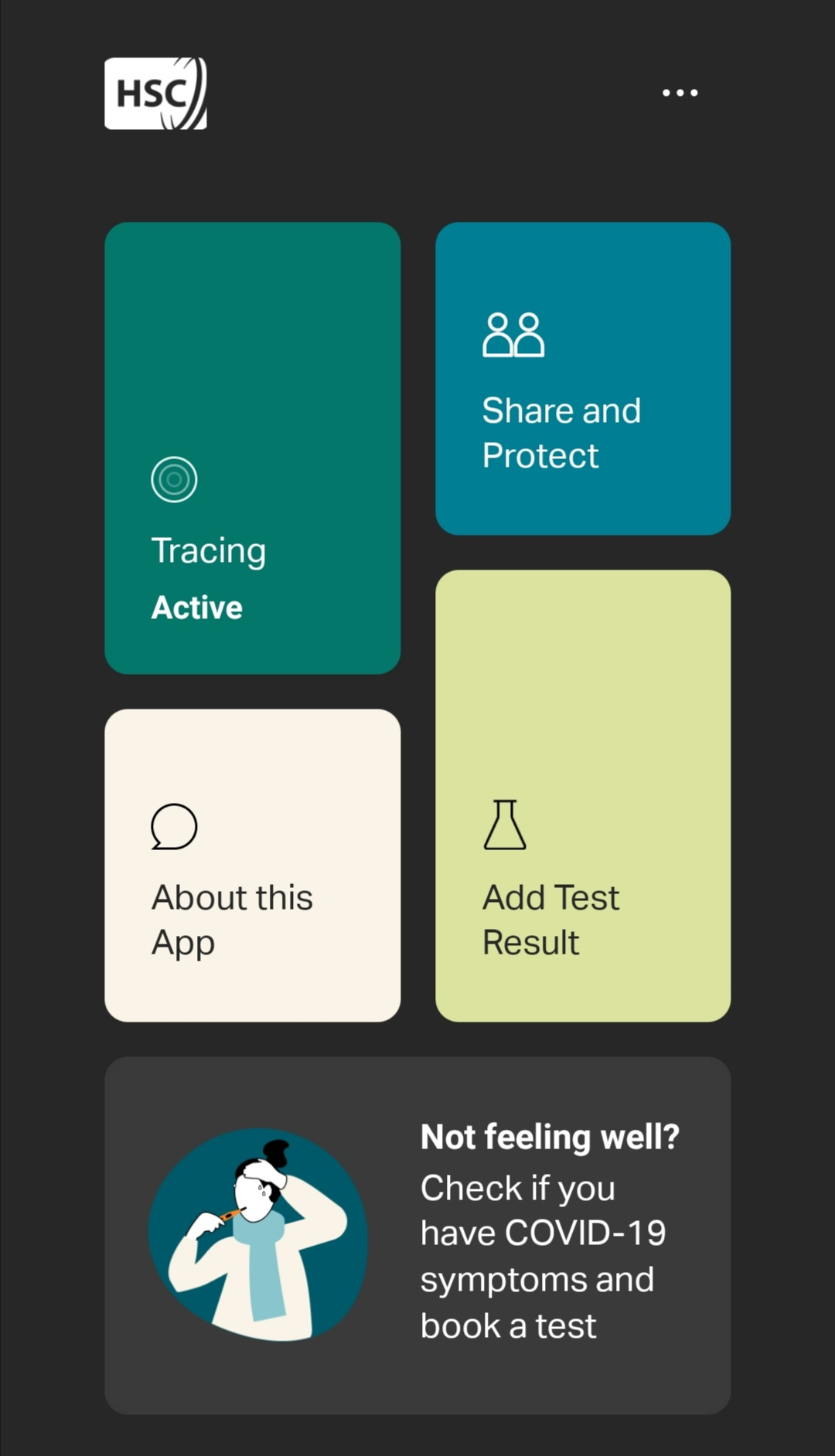
StopCOVID NI app, the contact tracing app for COVID-19 in Northern Ireland

On 20 June, there were no confirmed cases in the previous 24 hours for the first time since the first week of March. From 23 June it was permitted for 6 people to meet indoors, maintaining social distancing and no overnight stays. On 25 June it was announced that Northern Ireland would be reducing its 2-metre social distancing rule to 1 metre. At the end of June, there were a total of 5,760 confirmed cases of COVID-19 in Northern Ireland, with 551 deaths.

One 2 July First Minister Arlene Foster called on Michelle O'Neill to resign following her attendance at the funeral of Bobby Storey. Foster says she cannot "stand beside" O'Neill and "give out public health advice" after she attended the gathering of 120 people, breaking Northern Ireland government restrictions that say no more than 30 people should attend a funeral.

As concerns about increasing unemployment grow, on 6 July the UK government announced a £111m scheme to help firms in England provide an extra 30,000 trainee places; £21m will be provided to fund similar schemes in Scotland, Wales and Northern Ireland.

July saw a flood of relaxation of COVID-19 rules with betting shops, private clubs, restaurants, museums, and tourist sites opening on 3 July with salon and close contact services on 6 July. 10 July saw indoor gyms, outdoor playgrounds, weddings and baptisms, bingo and cinemas and competitive sports behind closed doors allowed. Libraries and indoor leisure centres followed. On 10 July the wearing of face coverings became compulsory on public transport in Northern Ireland, exceptions will be for those with a medical condition, children under the age of 13, and on school transport.

On 18 July research conducted by Ulster University indicated that an estimated 240,000 to 280,000 jobs could be at risk under two-metre social distancing regulations and that reducing it to one metre could save up to 30,000 jobs. On 22 July the Public Health Agency says it has identified 16 clusters of COVID-19 involving 133 cases since its contact-tracing system began operating.

On 30 July the Department of Health released its contact tracing app called StopCOVID NI. On 31 July the advice which advised people who are high risk to shield from the public was paused, allowing them to stop self-isolating. At the end of July, there were a total of 5,948 confirmed cases of COVID-19 in Northern Ireland, with 556 deaths.

On 5 August cases in Northern Ireland passed six thousand. On 6 August 43 new cases were announced by the Public Health Agency, the highest daily increase since the middle of May. On the same day the Executive announced that face coverings will become mandatory from 10 August and also the reopening of pubs that do not serve food has been postponed until 1 September.

Again, on the same day, it was announced that all pupils will return to school five days a week as normal at the start of term time in September. Education Minister Peter Weir announced that years 1 to 10 will return to class in protected bubbles, with minimised movements between classes for years 11 to 14.

On 20 August the Executive announced that some restrictions were to be reintroduced following rising cases in recent days. Restrictions announced included reducing indoor gatherings from 10 to six people and outdoor meetings from 30 to 15. On the same day the PSNI announced that they would be focusing enforcement on hot spots around Northern Ireland to stop the spread of COVID-19. At the end of August, there were a total of 7,245 confirmed cases of COVID-19 in Northern Ireland, with 560 deaths.

=== Second Wave and New Lockdown (September–November 2020) ===
On 1 September children returned to school for the first time since the beginning of the pandemic. On 9 September figures released by the Department of Education show that COVID-19 cases have been reported at 64 Northern Ireland schools in the first two weeks of the autumn term.

On 10 September the Northern Ireland Executive imposed new restrictions on visiting homes for Ballymena, and parts of Glenavy, Lisburn and Crumlin, following a rise in COVID-19 cases in those areas. From the following week, people living in those areas are limited to social gatherings of six and are encouraged not to travel outside the areas. The Executive also announced further easing of restrictions nationally in Northern Ireland such as the reopening of wet bars on 21 September.

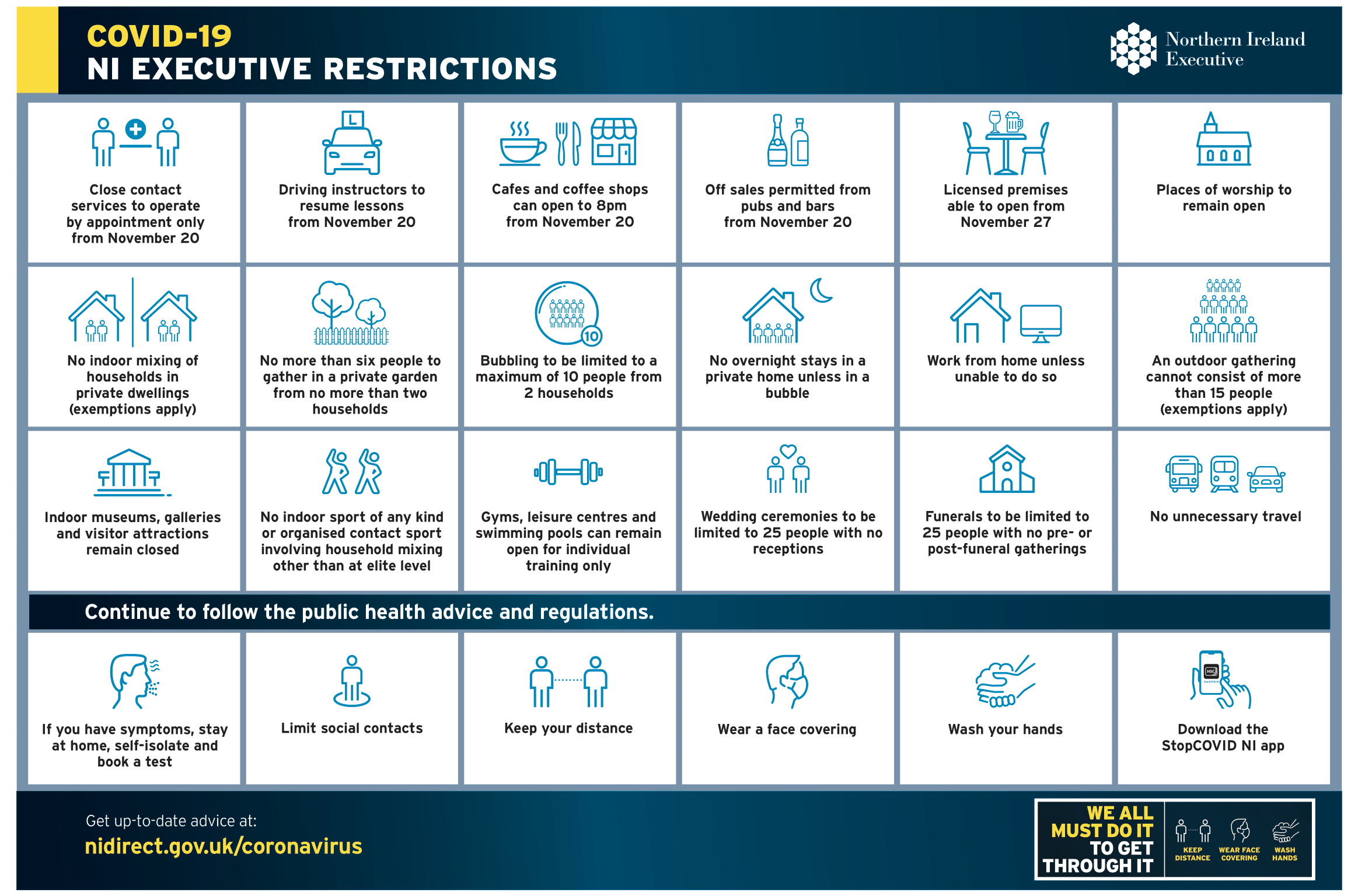
New information regarding restrictions released in November 2020

On 21 September the Northern Ireland Executive announced that localised restrictions that had been implemented in various postcodes throughout Northern Ireland would now be applied nationwide from 18:00 on 22 September. The restrictions include: no more than six people to gather in a private garden from no more than two households and rule out any mixing of households in private dwellings, with some exceptions such as bubbling with one other household, caring responsibilities including childcare, visits required for legal or medical purposes and several others.

Speaking about the new restrictions deputy First Minister Michelle O Neil said "We have between two to three weeks from now to suppress substantial transmission, otherwise we risk even more cases by mid-October. The data is showing very clearly that the number of areas of concern are multiplying very rapidly."

On 28 September Health Minister Robin Swann announced that Northern Ireland had been selected as one of the regions to take part in a major UK trial of a potential vaccine developed by Novavax and supported by the Public Health Agency. Initially, there will be 350 volunteers taking part in the trial in Northern Ireland, speaking about the trial Swann said "It is vital that Northern Ireland joins this important world-wide effort." On the same day Ulster GAA announced loses of more than £2 million due to the pandemic so far. At the end of September there were 11,693 confirmed cases and 579 confirmed deaths.

On 2 October fresh restrictions were announced for Derry and Strabane, with pubs, cafes, restaurants, and hotels permitted only to offer takeaway and delivery services, as well as outdoor dining. Derry's Altnagelvin Hospital also suspends some services to deal with COVID patients. Prime Minister Boris Johnson also announced extra financial support for the Northern Ireland Executive to help deal with a second wave of COVID-19.

On 14 October the Northern Ireland Executive announced a new 'circuit breaker' lockdown effective from Friday 16 October for four weeks. Measures include:

- Schools to close from 19 October until 30 October;
- Bubbling to be limited to a maximum of 10 people from two households;
- No overnight stays in a private home unless in a bubble;
- Closure of the hospitality sector apart from deliveries and takeaways for food, with the existing closing time of 11.00pm remaining.
- Other takeaway premises will be brought in line with hospitality with a closing time of 11.00pm;
- Close contact services such as hairdressers and beauticians are not permitted to open, apart from those relating to the continuation of essential health interventions and therapeutics.
- No indoor sport of any kind or organised contact sport involving household mixing other than at elite level;
- No mass events involving more than 15 people (except for allowed outdoor sporting events where the relevant number for that will continue to apply);
- Gyms may remain open but for individual training only with local enforcement in place;
- Funerals to be limited to 25 people with no pre- or post-funeral gatherings;
- Off licenses and supermarkets will not sell alcohol after 8.00pm;
- Wedding ceremonies and civil partnerships to be limited to 25 people with no receptions. This will be implemented on Monday 19 October. Venues providing the post-ceremony or partnership celebration this weekend may remain open for this purpose but may not provide other services for people who are not part of the wedding or partnership party and this will be limited to 25;

And the following advice will be added to the existing health guidance:

- Remote work unless unable to do so;
- Universities and further education to deliver distance learning to the maximum extent possible with only essential face to face learning where that is a necessary and unavoidable part of the course;
- No unnecessary travel should be undertaken.

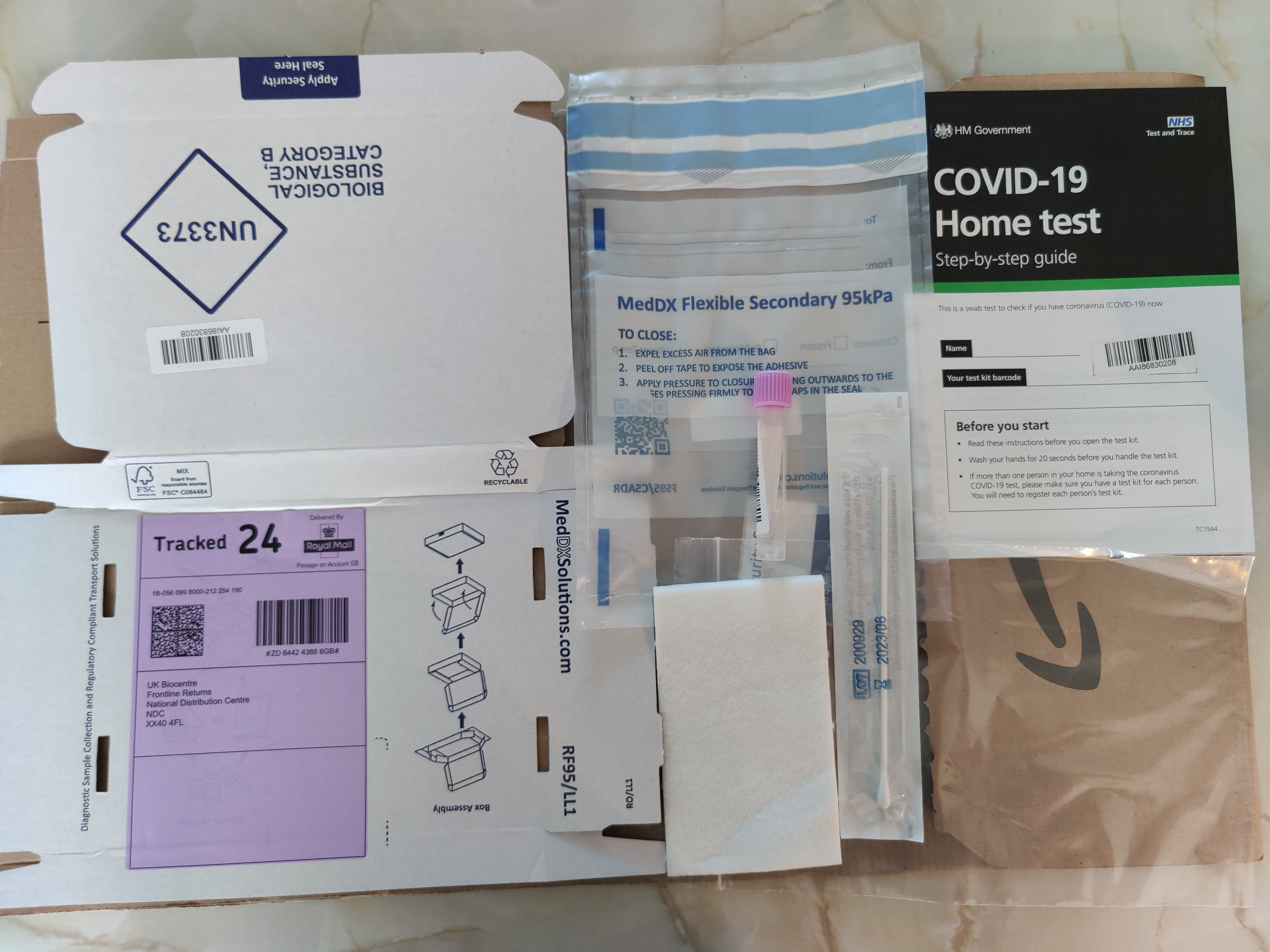
A home testing kit for COVID-19 in the UK

Speaking about the new restrictions, First Minister Arlene Foster said: "We are facing the tough reality of rapidly rising rates of infection. There are increasing numbers of people requiring acute care in our hospitals and sadly we learned yesterday of the death of seven people from Covid-19. The Executive has given careful and painstaking consideration of the right blend of actions that will do maximum damage to the virus but minimum harm to life chances today and tomorrow. We understand that these interventions will be hard but they will not be in place for a moment longer than they need to be. I would ask everyone to work with us to save lives and protect our health service."

On 14 October Health Minister Robin Swann also announced that the Nightingale Hospital at Belfast City Hospital was to reopen. Speaking about the decision Swann said, "It is not something I wanted to do – it was a decision I tried to hold off on for as long as possible. The virus is rapidly and exponentially and urgent action was needed."

On 4 November 2020, after 10 new deaths were reported, health officials advised extension of the COVID-19 restrictions on the hospitality sector for another two weeks to avoid further interventions before Christmas.

On 12 November restrictions were extended by one week, with some hospitality restrictions extending by two weeks until 27 November. The new measures introduced are as follows:

- Hair and beauty salons and driving instructors will reopen, by appointment, on 20 November.
- Hospitality will reopen on a "graduated basis", with unlicensed premises such as cafes and coffee shops also opening on 20 November, but with a closing time of 20:00 GMT.
- Alcohol cannot be purchased or consumed on such premises.
- Pubs and bars will be permitted to sell sealed off sales on 20 November.
- Restaurants, pubs, and hotels can reopen on 27 November, as the rest of the COVID-19 restrictions introduced on 16 October will expire at midnight on 26 November.

On 19 November the Executive announced that further lockdown restrictions will be introduced on 27 November. This includes all measures previously introduced in October, however cafes and all non-licensed hospitality will have to close once again, non-essential shops will close and all entertainment and leisure facilities such as swimming pools and gyms will be closed as well.

On 24 November plans for COVID measures over Christmas were announced by the First and deputy First Ministers, with up to three households allowed to meet up indoors and outdoors from 23 to 27 December, in line with the rest of the UK. But unlike the UK's other constituent countries, restrictions will be relaxed in Northern Ireland from 22 to 28 December to accommodate those traveling to and from the UK mainland, though they will not be allowed to meet up on those extra days.

=== Third lockdown, vaccine program (December 2020–February 2021) ===
On 3 December, the Executive agreed to ease restrictions on 11 December. Non-essential retail, close contract business, churches and gyms can reopen with social distancing and some limitations being observed. Parts of the hospitality industry can reopen such as cafes, restaurants and bars that serve food can open but must be closed by 23:00, wet pubs must remain shut.

Northern Ireland began distribution of the Pfizer/BioNTech vaccine on 8 December 2020, beginning with residents and staff of the Palmerston care home in Belfast.

On 17 December, due to an increase in cases and hospitalizations, the Executive announced a new strict six-week lockdown to begin on 26 December. Entertainment and leisure facilities, hospitality businesses, close contact businesses, and non-essential shops must close once again, now also including garden centres, homeware shops, and click-and-collect services. Hotels must close after 28 December, and all sports are prohibited, even at the elite level.

Due to the spread of a new variant of COVID-19 throughout Northern Ireland, the Executive hardened restrictions further on 5 January 2021. From Friday 8 January a stay-at-home order became law meaning people can only leave home for medical or food needs, exercise, and work that cannot be done remotely. Further restrictions were also announced for schools with pupils from nursery, primary and post-primary schools carrying out remote learning until after the mid-term break in the middle of February 2021.

In late January the executive announced that restrictions would continue until the beginning of March due to the continuing high numbers of people in hospital with COVID-19. This extension of restrictions would also apply to schools.

On 18 February the Executive announced that restrictions would again be extending until Thursday 1 April, with a review date on Thursday 18 March. The only change in the lockdown restrictions will be primary school pupils in primaries one, two, and three will return to school on Monday 8 March.

=== Vaccinations continue and lockdown easing (March–May 2021) ===
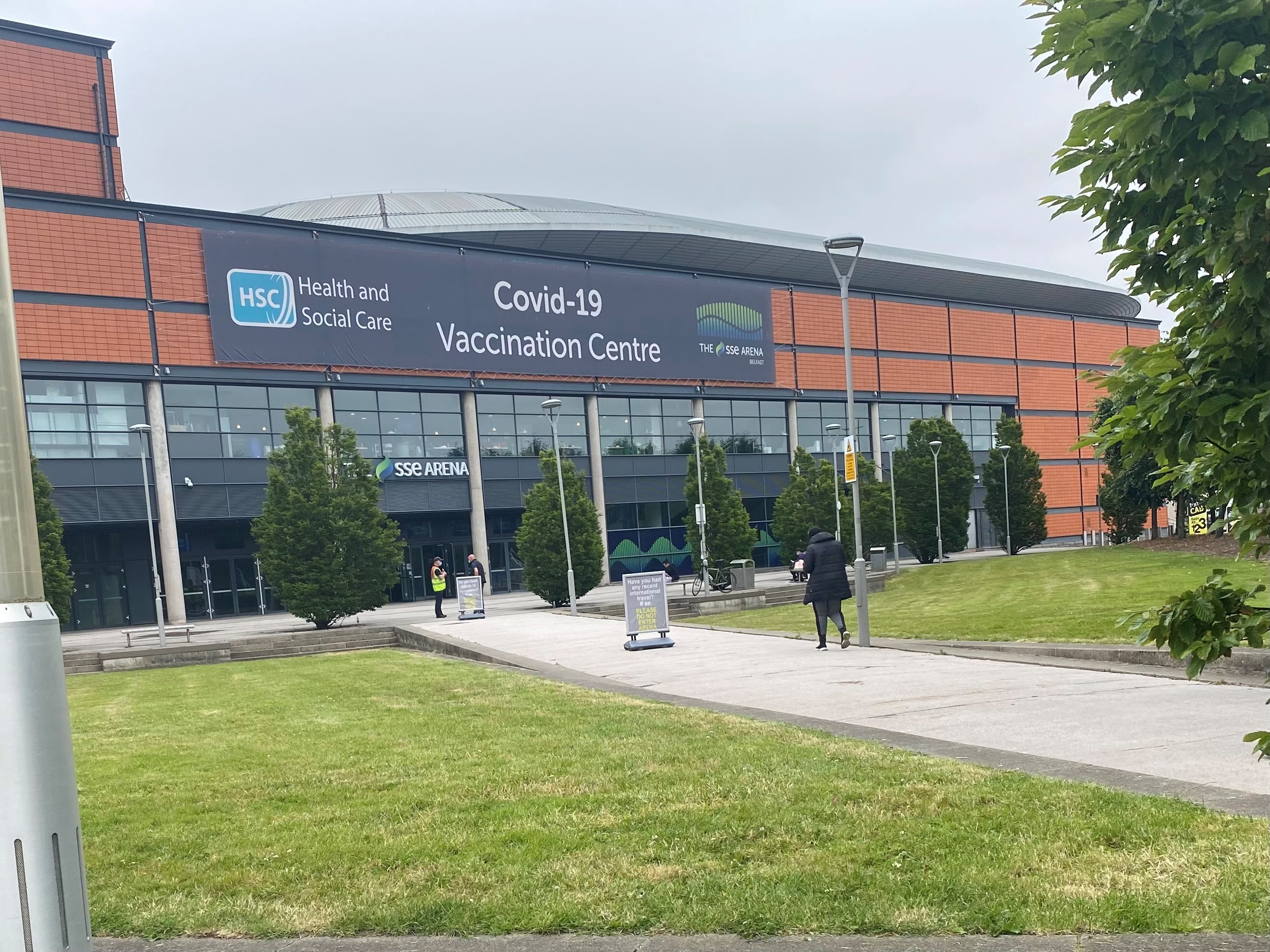
Mass vaccination centre at the SSE Arena in Belfast

On 2 March the Northern Ireland Executive unveils what deputy First Minister Michelle O'Neill describes as a "hopeful and cautious" exit strategy from lockdown, but unlike England and Scotland, there is not a timetable for lifting the measures. Instead, ministers will meet each week to assess the information available to them and decide which restrictions can be lifted. First Minister Arlene Foster acknowledges the frustration felt by people but says the Northern Ireland Executive has learnt a lot about the virus over the past year. Health Minister Robin Swann acknowledges people's frustration at the lack of dates in the Executive's lockdown exit strategy but says there are too many uncertainties to give specific dates.

On 16 March the Executive announced the first stages of lockdown easing with the following changes;

- On 22 March pupils from primary years 4 to 7 will return to school.
- On 1 April people can meet in groups of 10 from two households for outdoor exercise, golf and other outdoor sports can resume, six people from two households can meet in a private garden, garden centres can operate click and collect services.
- On 12 April all other school year groups will return to school, stay at home message is relaxed, all other non-essential retail can resume click and collect services, sports training can resume with a 15-person limit, 10 people from two households can meet in a private garden.

Responding to criticism the First Minister said a cautious approach was necessary, "I know that there is a great desire to open up in a faster fashion. Our taskforce in the executive will not just look at the health data, which of course is important, but the economic and societal data as well".

On 15 April the Executive announced further easing of restrictions. Further sections of society are due to open on the following dates:

Friday 23 April

- Hairdressers & close contact services
- Driving lessons and tests can resume
- Outdoor visitor attractions
- Static band practice / rehearsals permitted outdoors
- Competitive sports by clubs affiliated to sport bodies or organisations

Friday 30 April

- Non-essential retail
- Gyms and swimming pools
- Unlicensed and licensed premises
- Curfews removed on takeaways and off licenses
- Caravans & self-contained tourism accommodation
- 15 people from three households can meet in a private garden

Monday 24 May

- Indoor hospitality including pubs and hotels
- Remainder of tourist accommodation
- Indoor visitor attractions
- Indoor group exercise
- Indoor visits in domestic settings

Reacting to the news deputy First Minister Michelle O'Neill said "The restrictions have been a necessary way to suppress the virus, to save lives and protect our health service. But they have taken their toll. And it is incumbent on us to move forward as soon as circumstances allow". Health Minister Robin Swann said "Every one of us has a part to play in maintaining progress – by getting vaccinated when our turn comes and by sticking with the actions that have served us well for the past year – including social distancing, wearing a mask, washing hands. It's also vital to remember that outdoor settings are significantly safer than indoors"

=== Further lockdown easing and arrival of Delta Variant (June–Late 2021) ===
On 30 June the highest number of daily COVID cases since February was recorded with 375 new cases. The figures prompted senior health officials to urge younger people to get vaccinated. On 1 July it was announced that the delta variant accounted for two thirds of COVID cases in Northern Ireland. On the same day the Executive announced further easing of restrictions due to come into effect on 5 July. Relaxations due to come into effect on 5 July include:

- Live music can resume in both indoor and outdoor settings
- Cap on outdoor gatherings removed
- Three households can meet in a private garden, limited to 15 people
- All gatherings (excluding those in domestic settings), will now only be subject to a risk assessment if they have more than 15 people for indoors or more than 30 for outdoors
- Overnight residential stays for children and young people can also resume
Roadmap for exiting lockdown published by the Northern Ireland Executive.
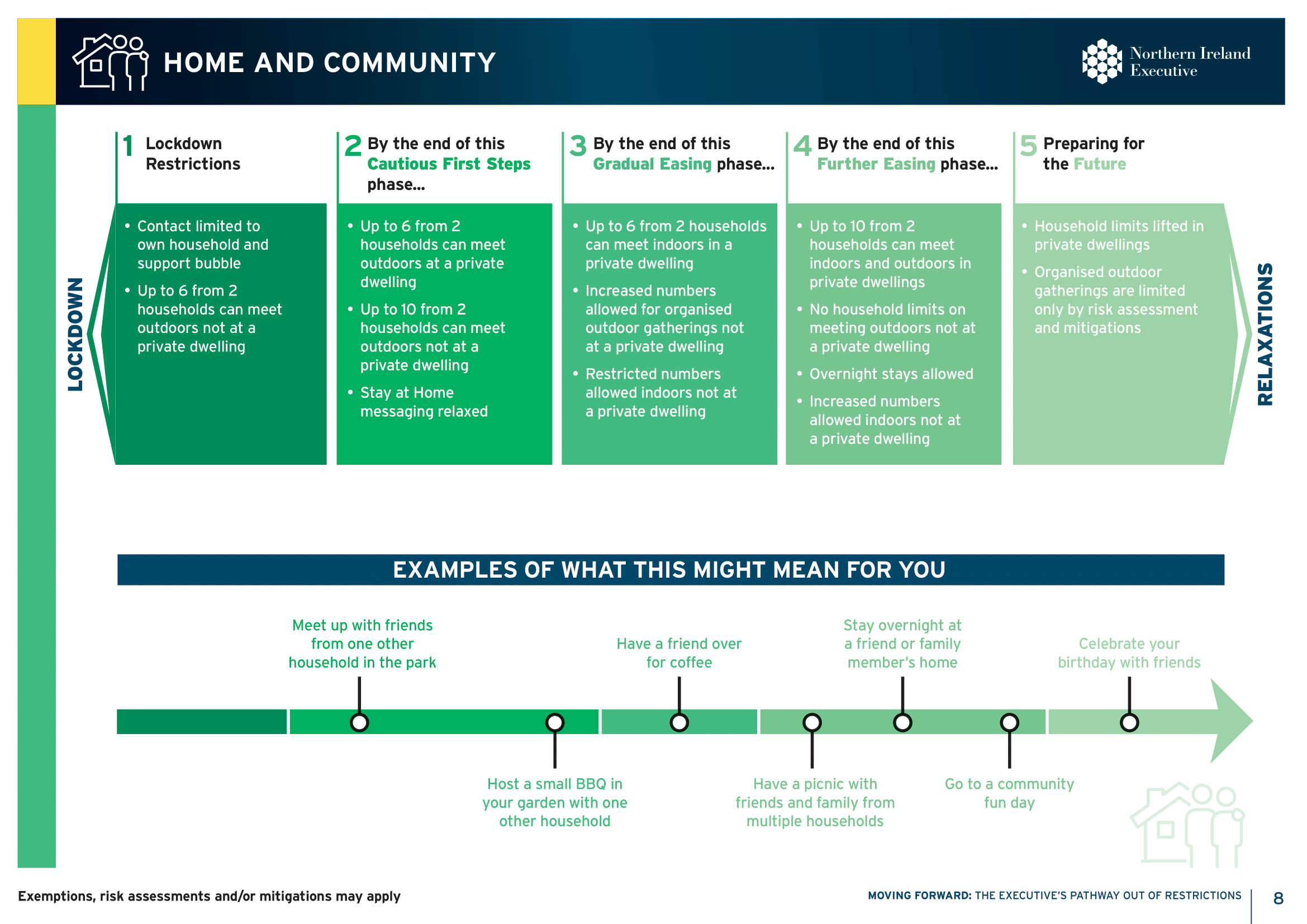

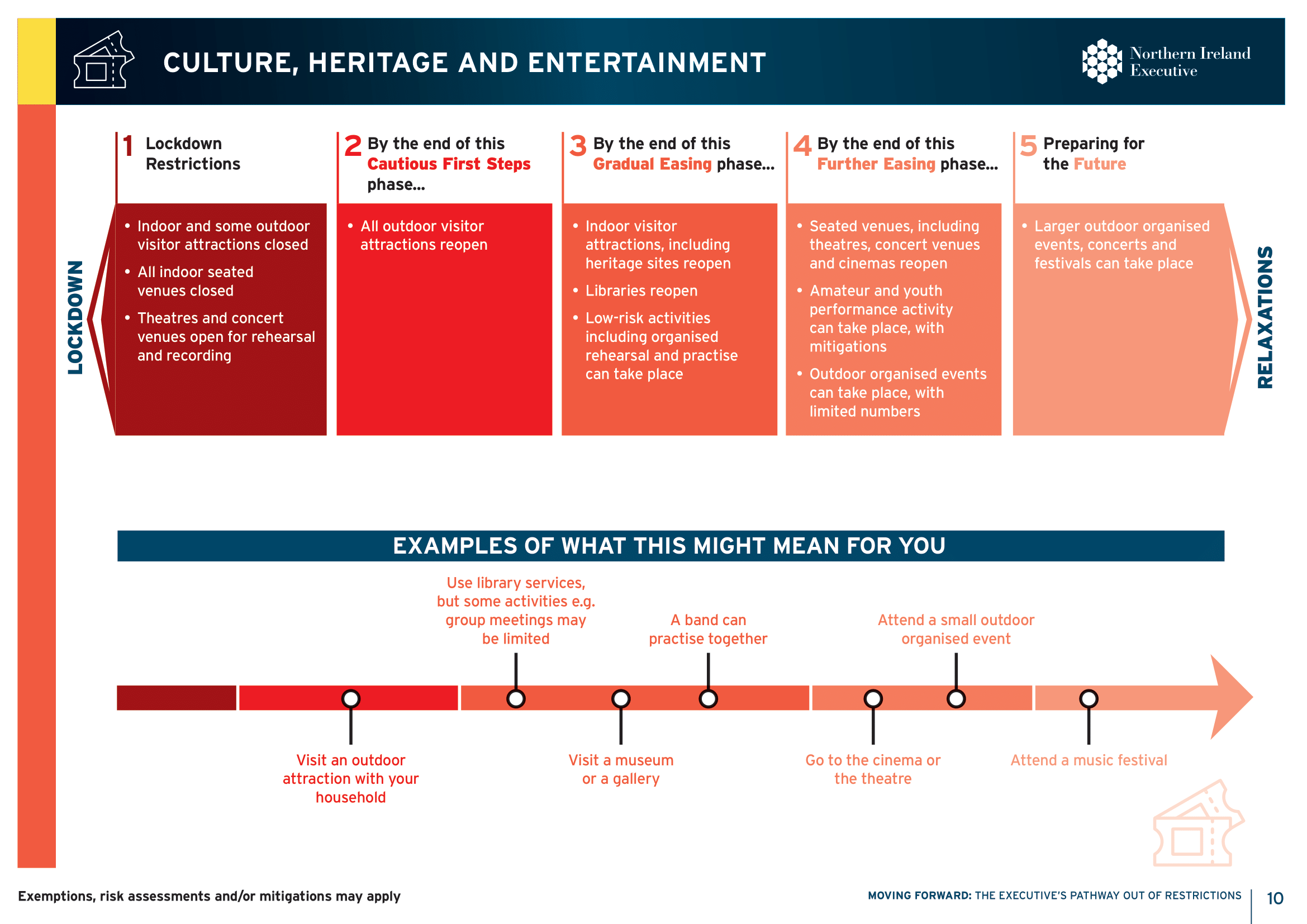

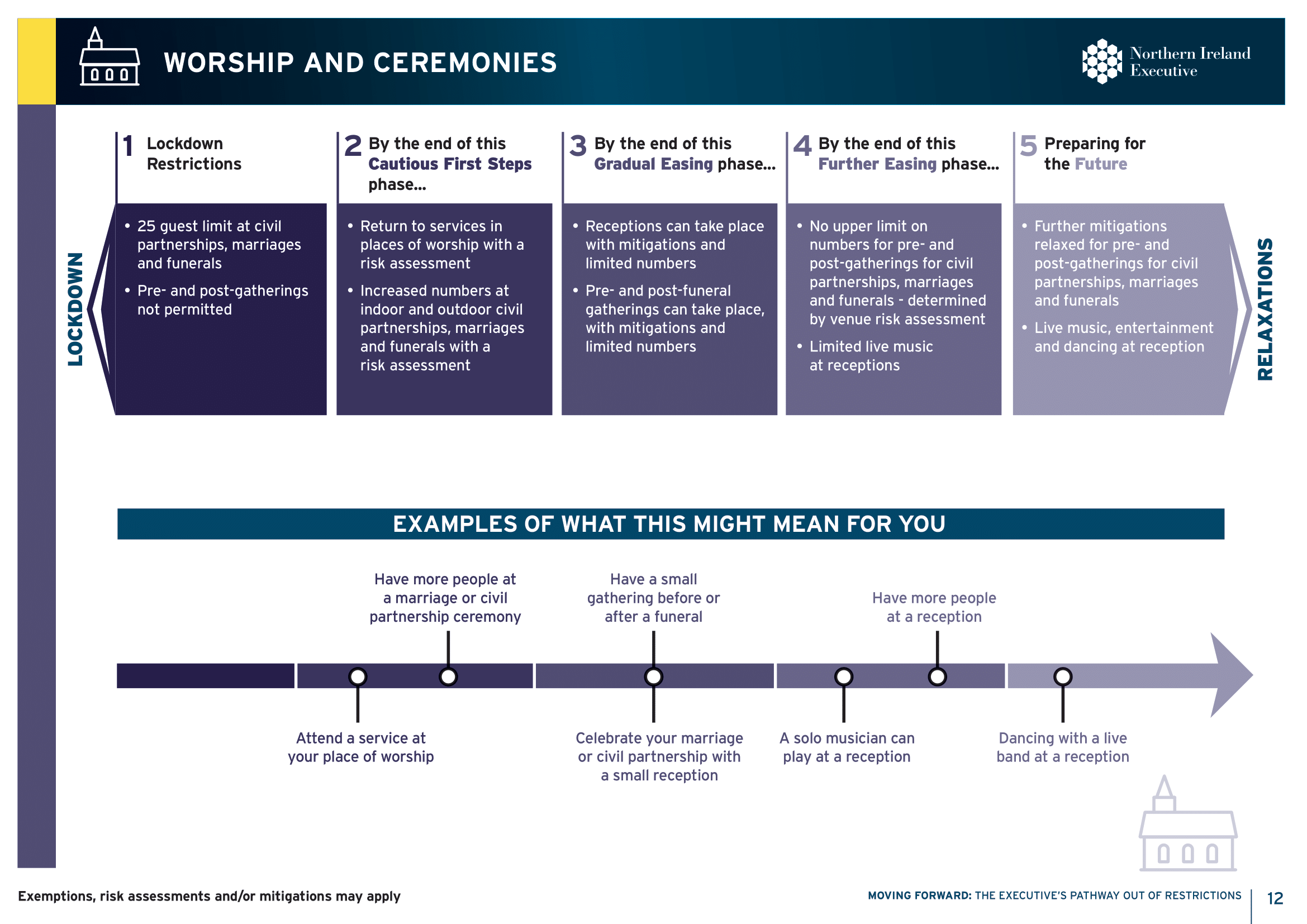

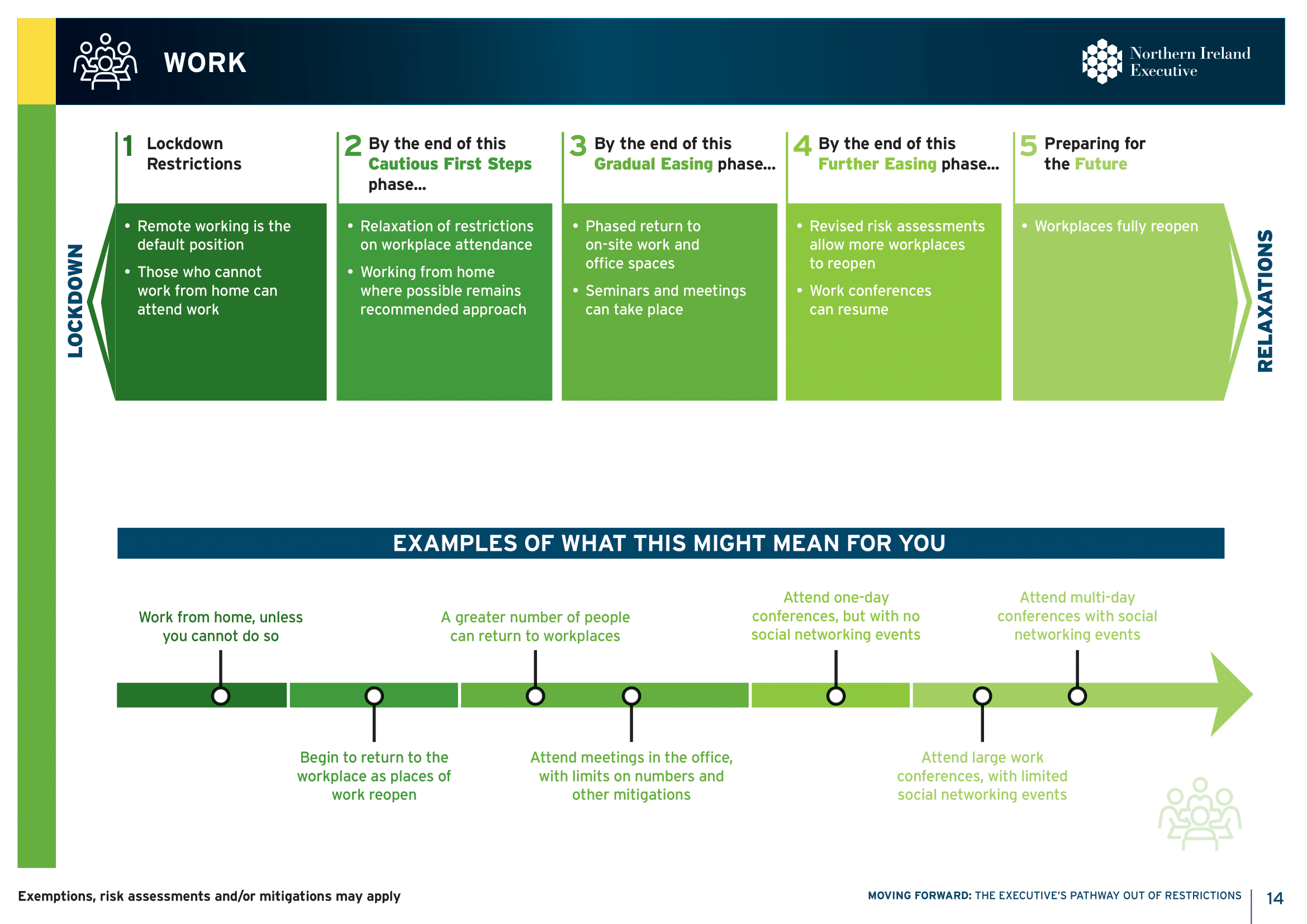

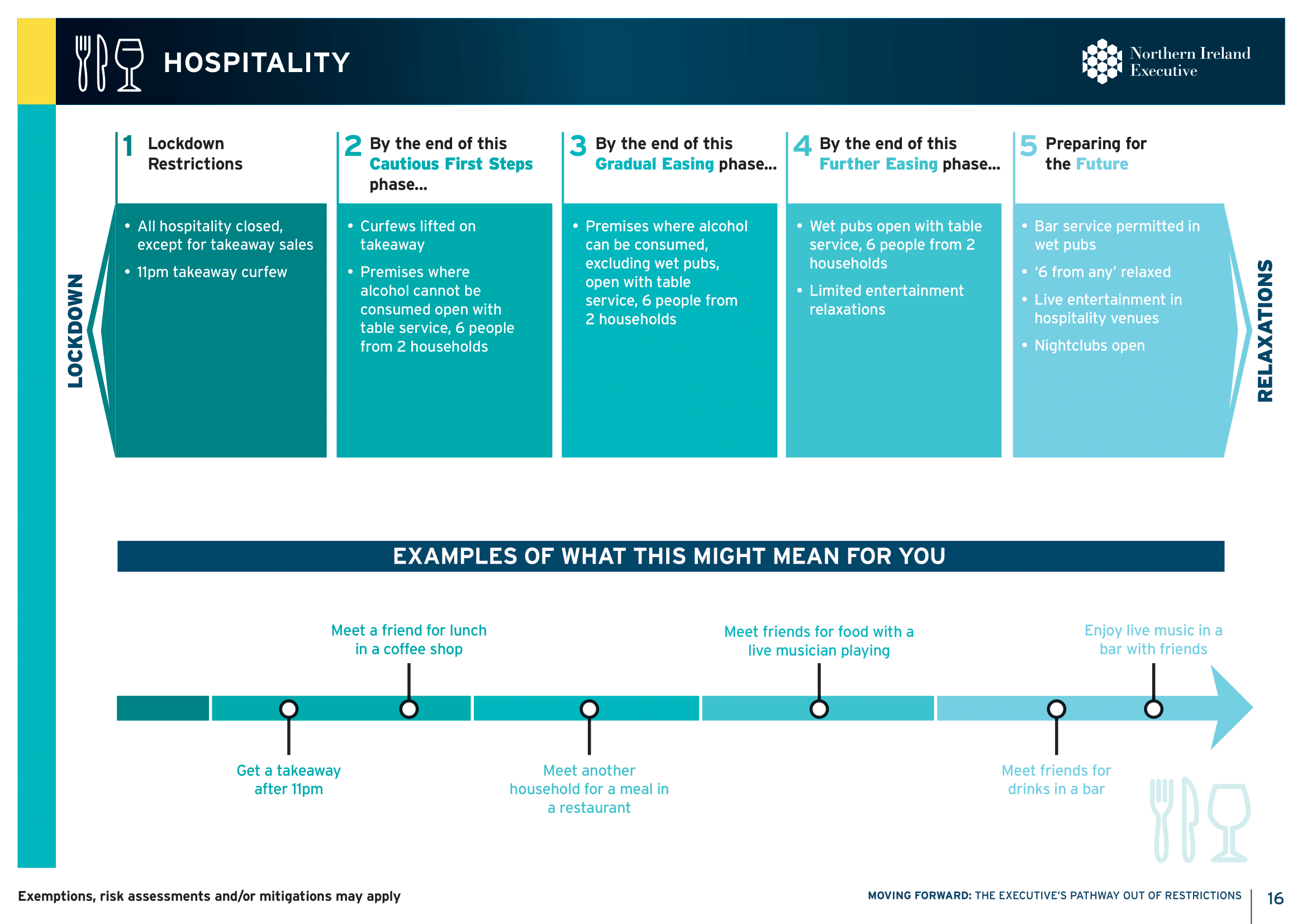

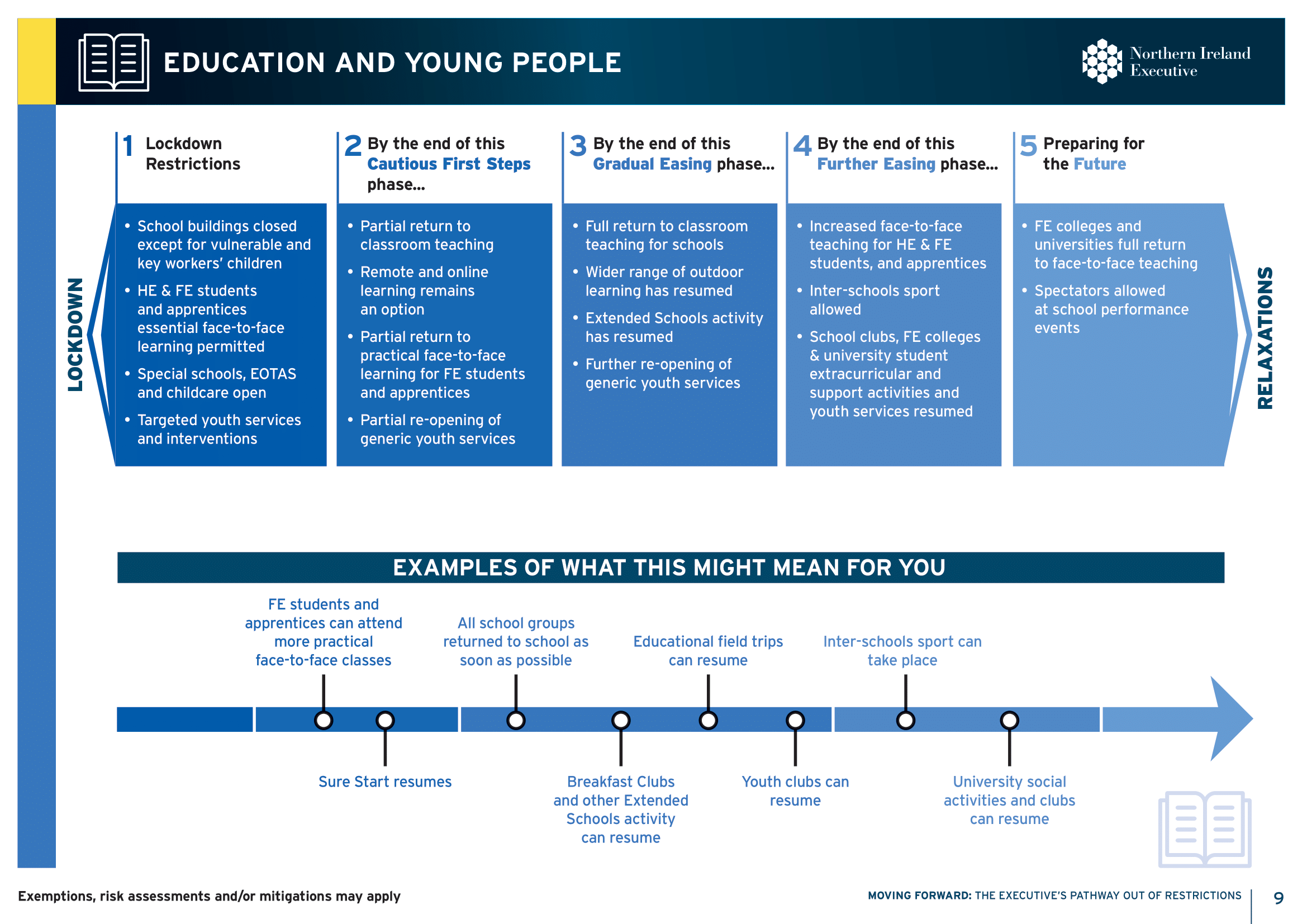

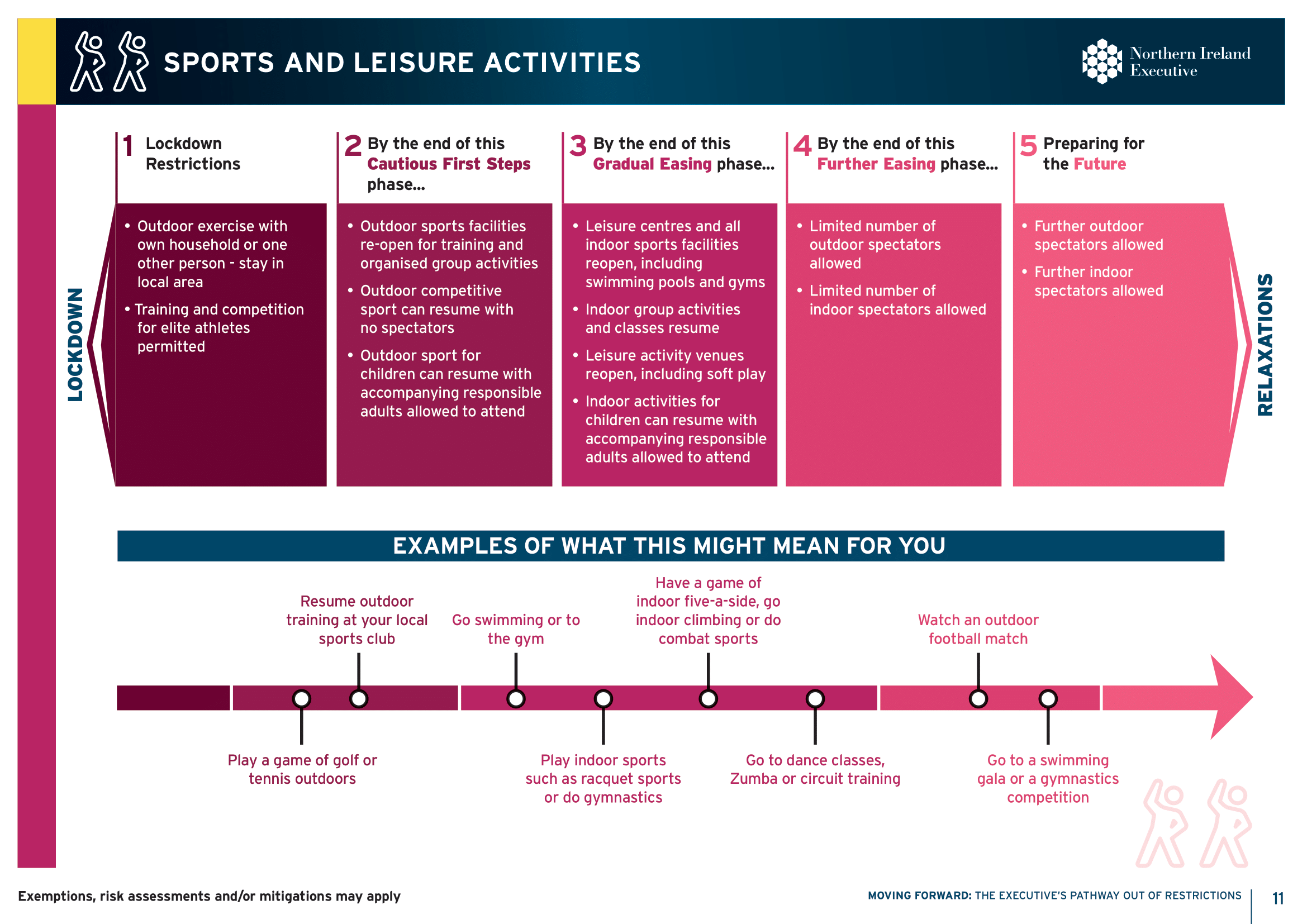

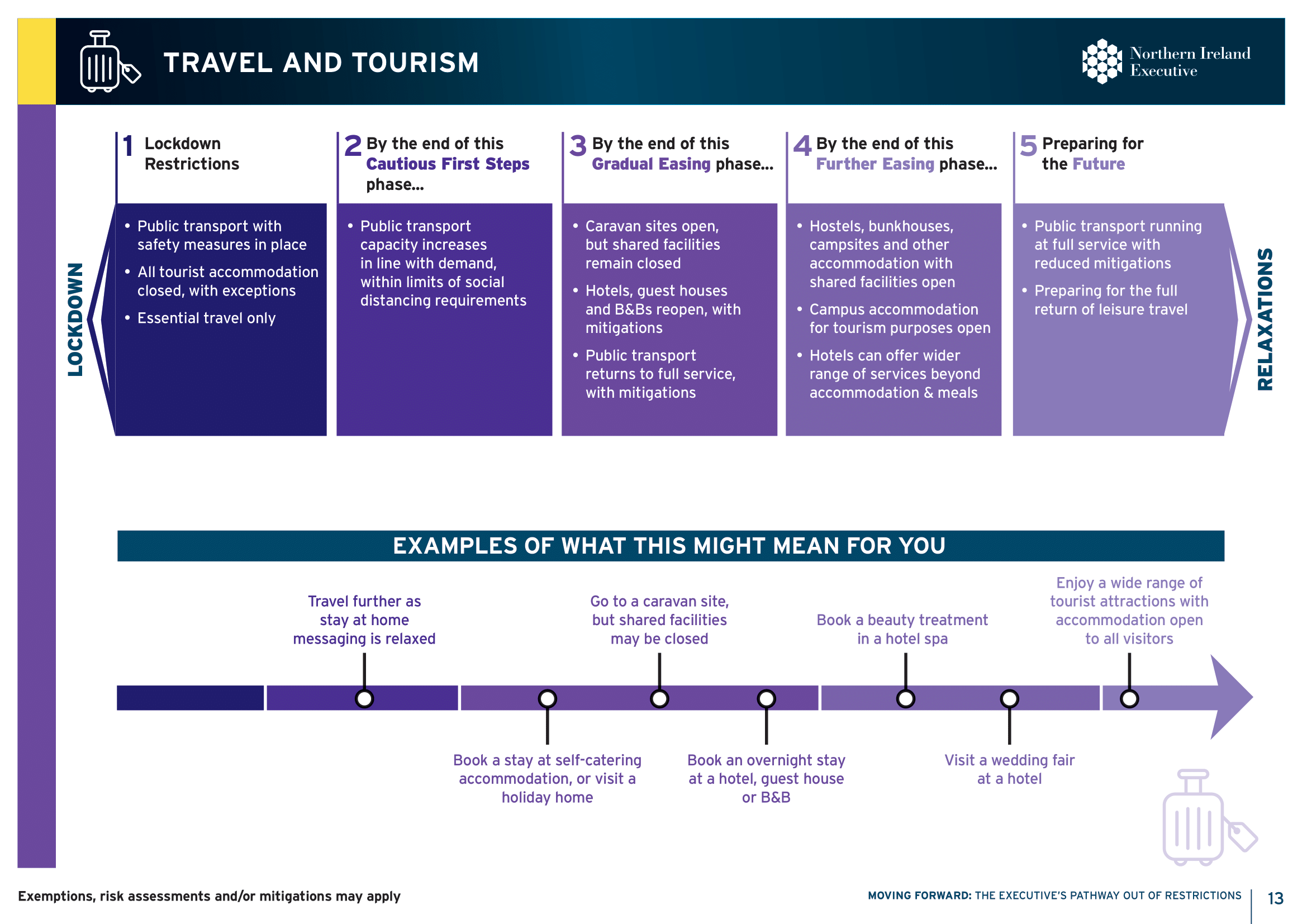

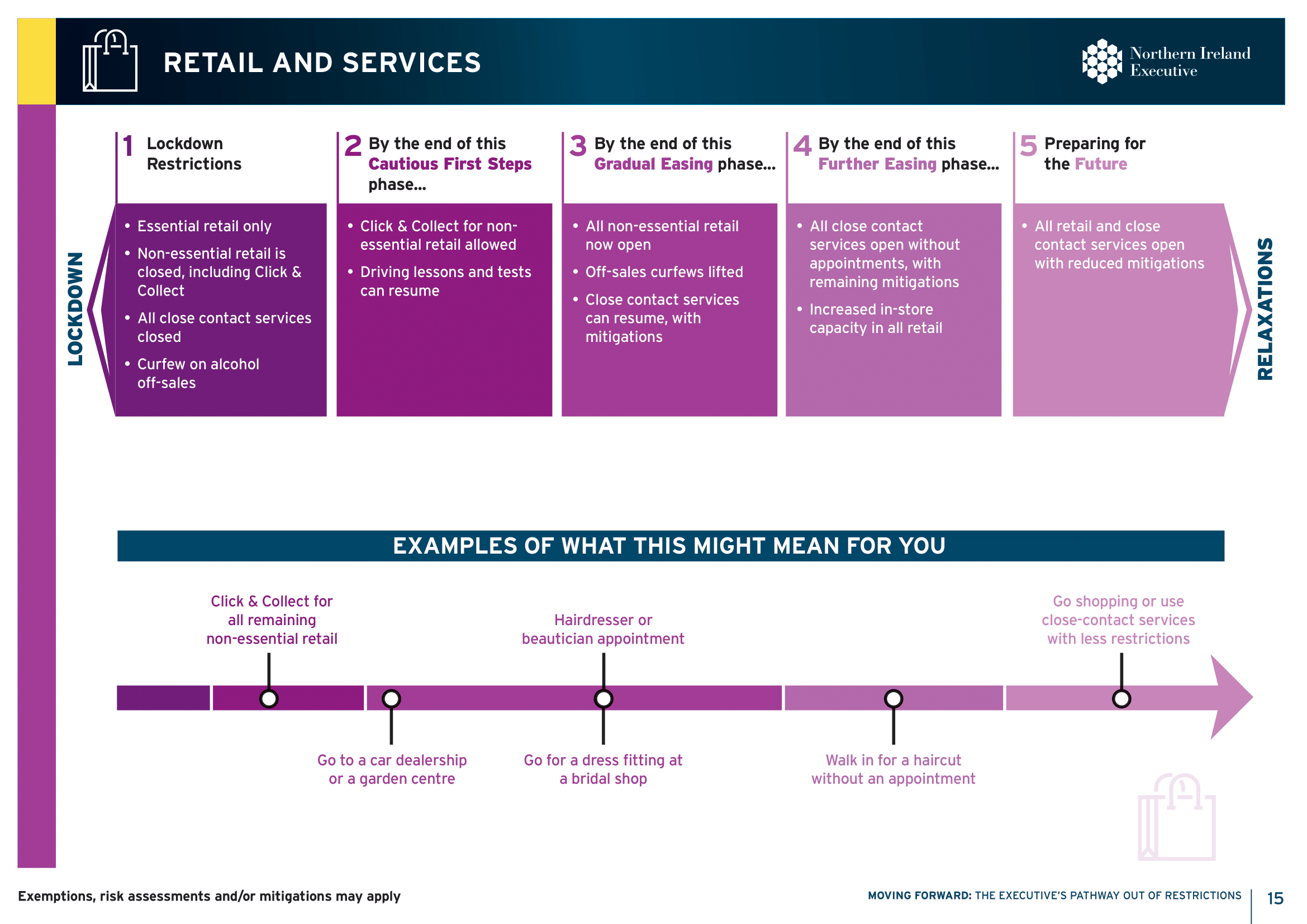

On 7 September the Executive agreed a number of rule changes to take effect from 5 pm on Friday 10 September. They include raising the number of people allowed to gather in an indoor domestic setting from 10 to 15, the removal of table service requirements from indoor and outdoor settings, and the removal of the requirement for pre-booked tickets and seat reservations for events. People will also be allowed to play pool, darts and gaming machines in hospitality settings, while dancing will also be allowed at weddings and civil partnership receptions. On 27 September the Executive agreed to end social distancing restrictions for shops, theatres and a number of other indoor settings in Northern Ireland from 6 pm on 30 September.

On 7 October the Executive agreed to scrap the requirement for social distancing in bars and restaurants from 31 October, meaning nightclubs will be allowed to reopen from that date.

On 17 November Northern Ireland's ministers vote to introduce mandatory COVID passports for Northern Ireland from December, which will need to be produced for entry into pubs, restaurants and nightclubs.

=== Omicron variant and removal of all restrictions (December 2021–Early 2022) ===
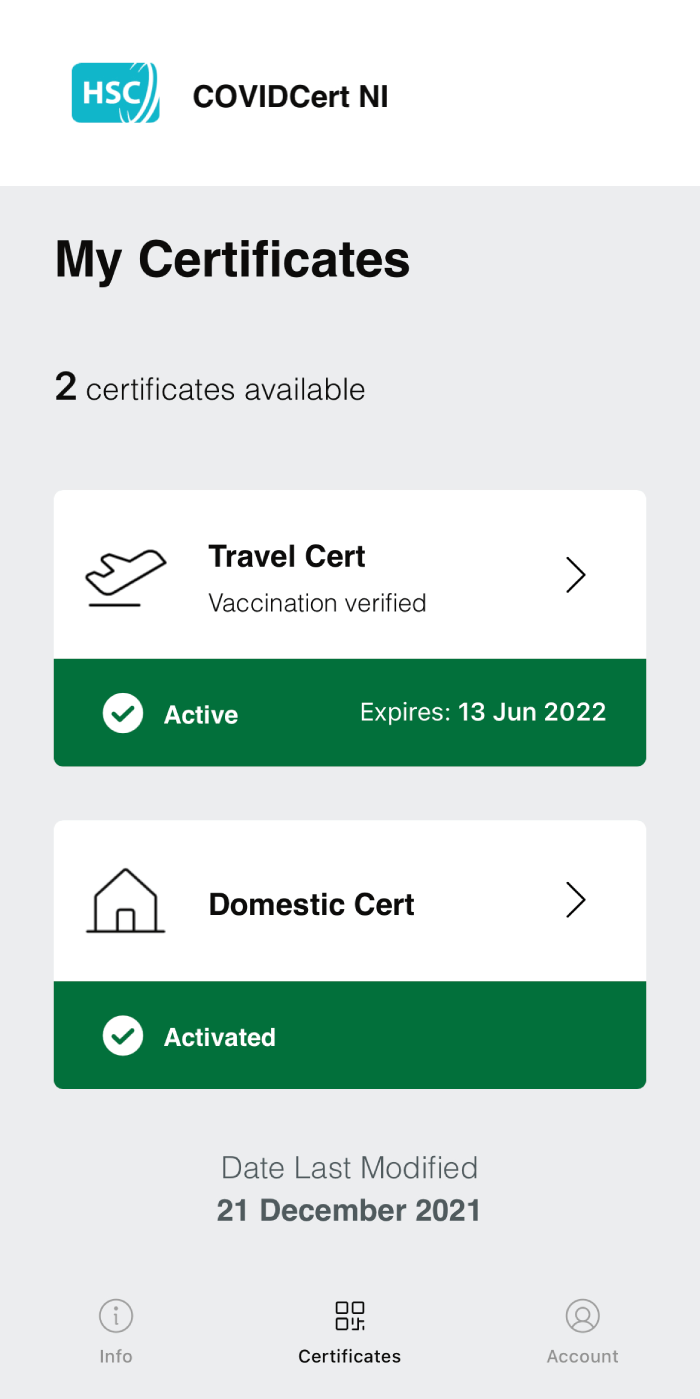
The COVIDCert NI app which is used for proof of vaccination

On 7 December 2021 the omicron variant was confirmed in Northern Ireland for the first time. The variant is believed to be the most mutated version of COVID-19 and is highly transmissible. In response to this Stormont followed Westminster by tightening rules to require travellers arriving from abroad to take a pre-departure COVID test.

COVID passes became enforceable on 13 December for hospitality businesses in Northern Ireland, with a £10,000 fine for any venue that does not comply. Customers can only enter a premises if they are fully vaccinated, have previously tested positive for covid in the required timeframe or can produce a recent negative lateral flow test result.

It was announced on 16 December that there are 210 confirmed omicron cases in Northern Ireland, but ministers have warned of the potential for 11,000 cases per day in the coming weeks. In a letter to HM Treasury, Finance Minister Conor Murphy calls for the furlough scheme to be reinstated and for more financial support for Stormont.

On 22 December the Northern Ireland Executive announced that new restrictions would need to be re-introduced in response to the omicron variant. The new measures to be introduced include:

26 December 2021

- Nightclubs must close.
- Dancing is prohibited in hospitality venues (weddings and civil ceremonies exempt).
- All indoor standing events are not allowed.

27 December 2021

- Customers must be seated in all indoor hospitality settings with a maximum of six people, or 10 people from a single household, allowed at a table (children aged 12 and under are not counted and this requirement does not apply to weddings or civil partnership celebrations).
- It is recommended that household mixing is limited to three households.
- Remote work message is reinforced.
- It is legally required that businesses take reasonable measures to achieve 2m social distancing in office spaces or, where this cannot be achieved, to provide alternative mitigations.

On 20 January 2022 the Executive announced that many of the current restrictions would be removed. From midnight on Friday 21 January the rule of six and table service requirements in hospitality will be removed, as will the limit of three households allowed to meet indoors in a home. On Wednesday 26 January nightclubs will be allowed to open and indoor standing events can resume.

Significantly, the Executive also announced that on 26 January 2022 that the requirement to show vaccination or covid status before entering many venues would be removed. However the rule will still exist for nightclubs and standing events with more than 500 people in attendance.

On 15 February 2022, all remaining COVID restrictions were lifted by the Executive.

On 22 April 2022 mass PCR testing ended in Northern Ireland, however lateral flow testing is still free for those with COVID symptoms or for those who are at high risk.

== Field hospitals ==
In mid-March, HSC Northern Ireland started planning to open a COVID-19 field hospital similar to those being introduced in England. The tower block of Belfast City Hospital was chosen as the first such facility, with 230 beds and staff from around the nation. The same report also stated that First Minister Arlene Foster had revealed that a Nightingale hospital could be based at the Eikon Exhibition Centre in Balmoral Park, and that the Department of Health was assessing its potential as a second Nightingale facility in preparation for a possible second wave later in 2020.

On 13 May, it was announced that the Nightingale facility at Belfast City Hospital was to close temporarily but could be opened up again in the event of a second wave. On 2 September the Health Minister announced plans to open a second Nightingale hospital which will be a step-down facility. It will be located in Whiteabbey Hospital, Co Antrim, and will include 100 intermediate care beds.

The Nightingale facility at Belfast City Hospital reopened on 14 October following a sharp rise in cases. The facility was closed down again on 12 April 2021.

== Vaccination program ==
Vaccination status of the estimated population above the age of 16 (1,488,100 as of mid-2018) on 11 April 2022.
1. Unvaccinated: ~62,782 people (4.00%)
2. One dose: 91,088 people (6.00%)
3. Two doses: 325,453 people (22.0%)
4. Three doses: 1,008,777 people (68.0%)
Vaccination status of the total population (1,895,510 as of 2018) on 11 April 2022.
1. Unvaccinated: ~470,192 people (25.0%)
2. Single dose: 91,088 people (5.00%)
3. Both doses: 325,453 people (17.0%)
4. Three doses: 1,008,777 people (53.0%)

On 9 November 2020, American pharmaceutical company Pfizer and German biotechnology company BioNTech announced a vaccine for COVID-19 that offered over 90% protection from the disease. Later it was announced that the vaccine offered over 94% protection for the over 65s. Following the announcement the Department of Health announced that Northern Ireland is likely to receive approximately 570,000 doses of the vaccine which could vaccinate approximately 285,000 people. On 17 November 2020 US company Moderna also announced a vaccine that offered 95% protection. On 23 November Oxford AstraZeneca announced that their COVID-19 vaccine has up to 90% efficacy.

On 2 December, UK Health Secretary Matt Hancock announced that the Pfizer/BioNTech vaccine had been approved for use and will start being rolled out throughout the UK on the week beginning 7 December.

On 8 December, Sister Joanna Sloan became the first person in Northern Ireland to receive the vaccine. Later that day the first care-home residents in Northern Ireland, at Palmerston care home in East Belfast, also received the vaccination.

The roll-out of the vaccination program will target all adults in Northern Ireland as all approved vaccines have yet to be approved for use in children. The adult population in Northern Ireland is estimated to be in the region of 1,400,000 people. The vaccine program was extended to children between the ages of 12 and 17 with special circumstances in July 2021, and then again to all 16 and 17-year-olds in early August 2021. This extended the vaccine program further into the population of Northern Ireland, which with the latest estimates from mid 2020, stands at 1,895,510 people.

On 27 May 2021 Northern Ireland became the first country in the United Kingdom to offer the vaccine to everyone above the age of 18.

The vaccine program to date has been rolled out on the following dates:

- Over 70s – December 2020
- Ages 65 to 70 – 27 January 2021
- Ages 60 to 64 – 1 March 2021
- Ages 50 to 59 – 15 March 2021
- Ages 45 to 49 – 31 March 2021
- Ages 40 to 44 – 8 April 2021
- Ages 35 to 39 – 19 April 2021 (partial), 25 April 2021 (full)
- Ages 30 to 34 – 30 April 2021
- Ages 25 to 29 – 20 May 2021
- Ages 18 to 24 – 27 May 2021
- Ages 16 to 17 – 4 August 2021
- Ages 12 to 15 (special circumstances) – 19 July 2021, (everyone) - September 2021

A booster program has been announced to begin in Autumn 2021 with the following categories getting the booster initially:

- People living in residential care homes for older adults
- All adults aged 50 years or over
- Front-line health and social care workers
- All those aged 16 to 49 years with underlying health conditions that put them at higher risk of severe COVID-19
- Adult household contacts of immunosuppressed individuals.

Following the arrival of the omicron variant the booster program was rolled out to all age categories on the following dates:

- All adults over 40 years old - 15 November 2021
- All adults over 30 years old - 12 December 2021
- All adults over 18 years old - 19 December 2021

To help accelerate the roll-out of the vaccine, on 29 March 2021 the first mass vaccination centre in Northern Ireland opened at the SSE Arena in Belfast. On the same day pharmacies throughout Northern Ireland were also eligible to administer the vaccine.

== Statistics ==
The official death toll from the Department of Health and Public Health Agency counts those who have died within 28 days of a COVID-19 diagnosis. It mostly consists of hospital deaths, but also includes COVID-19-positive deaths in care homes and the community that are reported by the health service. The Northern Ireland Statistics and Research Agency gives a higher death toll, as it also counts "suspected cases" where COVID-19 was mentioned on the death certificate but no test was done.

The statistics below run from when COVID-19 was first detected in Northern Ireland until 31 March 2022. Further information beyond this date can be found on the Department of Health dashboard and the UK Government dashboard.

=== Confirmed cases and deaths ===
Cases are likely to be higher as statistics are based on positive test results, also cases in early 2020 are estimated to be much higher as mass testing had not begun yet.

==== Confirmed cases ====
Per Week

View source data.

Per Day

View source data.

==== Deaths (Department of Health) ====
View source data.

=== Hospitalisations ===
Data is from hospitalisations reported on the Department of Health dashboard every day, this information may change at a later date.

==== Inpatients with confirmed COVID-19 ====
View source data.

==== Intensive care & ventilated patients with confirmed COVID-19 ====
The Department of Health dashboard only has information from the start of April on ICU patients.

View source data.

=== Vaccinations ===
Vaccination data is taken from the UK Government COVID-19 dashboard and the NI Covid-19 Vaccinations Dashboard. On the week ending 18 July 2021, the UK Government dashboard removed 16,162 first dose vaccinations from the overall total which was reflected in that week's numbers.

==== Weekly Vaccinations ====
View source data.

==== Total Vaccinations ====
View source data.

== Dates and sourcing ==
Cases and deaths below are those that are reported from the media and Department of Health on those specific dates, which is reflected in the sources, however these numbers can be changed retrospectively on the Department of Health dashboard. Blank boxes indicate that no information was released by the Department of Health for that date.

From 25 June to 9 August the Department of Health didn't release daily updates over weekends, this information was released on Mondays for this period. Vaccination data is taken from the same source as above and may change retrospectively.

As of 1 May 2021 the Department of Health didn't release daily updates over weekends, this information was released the following Monday for this period.

On 31 January 2022 the Department of Health began adding reinfections to the daily cases data. Case numbers prior to this date are higher than reported initially below because of this.

The information below covers from when COVID-19 was first detected in Northern Ireland until 31 March 2022. Further information beyond this date can be found on the Department of Health dashboard and the UK Government dashboard.

Data for February 2020 to February 2022
Date	Cases Reported	Deaths reported	Tests	Vaccine 1st Dose	Vaccine 2nd Dose	Vaccine 3rd Dose	Reference
27 Feb 2020	1	0	42				Ref
4 Mar 2020	2	0	30				Ref
6 Mar 2020	1	0	23				Ref
7 Mar 2020	3	0	23				Ref
8 Mar 2020	5	0	33				Ref
10 Mar 2020	4	0	168				Ref
11 Mar 2020	2	0	185				Ref
12 Mar 2020	2	0	160				Ref
13 Mar 2020	9	0	157				Ref
14 Mar 2020	5	0	145				Ref
15 Mar 2020	11	0	146				Ref
16 Mar 2020	7	0	193				Ref
17 Mar 2020	10	0	163				Ref
18 Mar 2020	6	1	257				Ref
19 Mar 2020	9	1	245				Ref
20 Mar 2020	9	0	321				Ref
21 Mar 2020	22	1	258				Ref
22 Mar 2020	20	1	247				Ref
23 Mar 2020	20	5	471				Ref
24 Mar 2020	24	2	429				Ref
25 Mar 2020	37	3	484				Ref
26 Mar 2020	32	11	551				Ref
27 Mar 2020	34	1	493				Ref
28 Mar 2020	49	7	441				Ref
29 Mar 2020	86	4	371				Ref
30 Mar 2020	123	4	545				Ref
31 Mar 2020	53	4	553				Ref
1 Apr 2020	103	3	615				Ref
2 Apr 2020	85	10	568				Ref
3 Apr 2020	130	9	579				Ref
4 Apr 2020	94	9	500				Ref
5 Apr 2020	91	8	368				Ref
6 Apr 2020	69	5	562				Ref
7 Apr 2020	97	5	624				Ref
8 Apr 2020	84	1	642				Ref
9 Apr 2020	138	7	728				Ref
10 Apr 2020	112	10	668				Ref
11 Apr 2020	128	15	434				Ref
12 Apr 2020	89	11	500				Ref
13 Apr 2020	76	6	520				Ref
14 Apr 2020	85	10	628				Ref
15 Apr 2020	121	6	794				Ref
16 Apr 2020	118	18	783				Ref
17 Apr 2020	137	18	854				Ref
18 Apr 2020	148	17	536				Ref
19 Apr 2020	159	1	391				Ref
20 Apr 2020	83	13	721				Ref
21 Apr 2020		9	879				Ref
22 Apr 2020	146	9	866				Ref
23 Apr 2020	142	13	689				Ref
24 Apr 2020	106	15	808				Ref
25 Apr 2020	104	16	553				Ref
26 Apr 2020	82	5	585				Ref
27 Apr 2020	66	10	1085				Ref
28 Apr 2020	34	20	1153				Ref
29 Apr 2020	55	9	1376				Ref
30 Apr 2020	73	9	1592				Ref
1 May 2020	87	18	1771				Ref
2 May 2020	63	11	1408				Ref
3 May 2020	78	5	1060				Ref
4 May 2020	69	6	1809				Ref
5 May 2020	45	17	1749				Ref
6 May 2020	53	14	2234				Ref
7 May 2020	50	4	1896				Ref
8 May 2020	38	4	1799				Ref
9 May 2020	56	4	1488				Ref
10 May 2020	41	5	1339				Ref
11 May 2020	30	3	1966				Ref
12 May 2020	44	9	2038				Ref
13 May 2020	60	2	2114				Ref
14 May 2020	38	5	1979				Ref
15 May 2020	26	15	2075				Ref
16 May 2020	40	4	1372				Ref
17 May 2020	28	3	1118				Ref
18 May 2020	16	6	2131				Ref
19 May 2020	20	7	2130				Ref
20 May 2020	18	5	2159				Ref
21 May 2020	42	7	1906				Ref
22 May 2020	23	3	2048				Ref
23 May 2020	41	1	1558				Ref
24 May 2020	25	1	1200				Ref
25 May 2020	39	8	1654				Ref
26 May 2020	28	0	1841				Ref
27 May 2020	26	2	1830				Ref
28 May 2020	16	2	1728				Ref
29 May 2020	17	3	1737				Ref
30 May 2020	13	1	1475				Ref
31 May 2020	7	1	1056				Ref
1 June 2020	12	1	2063				Ref
2 June 2020	4	2	2255				Ref
3 June 2020	8	8	2814				Ref
4 June 2020	33	1	2530				Ref
5 June 2020	3	1	2331				Ref
6 June 2020	14	1	1410				Ref
7 June 2020	6	0	1362				Ref
8 June 2020	6	0	2414				Ref
9 June 2020	3	0	2335				Ref
10 June 2020	13	0	2372				Ref
11 June 2020	4	1	2072				Ref
12 June 2020	16	1	1820				Ref
13 June 2020	3	2	1177				Ref
14 June 2020	7	0	1143				Ref
15 June 2020	4	0	2108				Ref
16 June 2020	2	1	2355				Ref
17 June 2020	8	1	2595				Ref
18 June 2020	1	0	2573				Ref
19 June 2020	3	1	1886				Ref
20 June 2020	0	1	974				Ref
21 June 2020	4	0	1063				Ref
22 June 2020	1	0	1953				Ref
23 June 2020	0	1	2195				Ref
24 June 2020	2	1	1698				Ref
25 June 2020	0	0	564				Ref
26 June 2020	4	1					Ref
27 June 2020	2	1	1851				Ref
28 June 2020	1	1	1405				Ref
29 June 2020	6	1	964				Ref
30 June 2020	3	0	803				Ref
1 July 2020	1	0	1948				Ref
2 July 2020	7	1	2069				Ref
3 July 2020	4	2	1508				Ref
4–6 July 2020	9	0	3445				Ref
7 July 2020	5	0	1067				Ref
8 July 2020	4	0	1228				Ref
9 July 2020	3	0	1777				Ref
10 July 2020	4	0	1777				Ref
11–13 July 2020	16	2	3241				Ref
14 July 2020	2	0	1275				Ref
15 July 2020	9	0	1315				Ref
16 July 2020	16	0	1365				Ref
17 July 2020	19	0	1807				Ref
18–20 July 2020	12	0	5030				Ref
21 July 2020	2	0	1579				Ref
22 July 2020	9	0	1829				Ref
23 July 2020	8	0	1851				Ref
24 July 2020	15	0	2020				Ref
25–27 July 2020	21	0	4625				Ref
28 July 2020	9	0	1547				Ref
29 July 2020	9	0	1687				Ref
30 July 2020	8	0	1973				Ref
31 July 2020	10	0	1621				Ref
1–3 August 2020	40	0	4632				Ref
4 August 2020	8	0	2021				Ref
5 August 2020	10	0	1779				Ref
6 August 2020	43	0	3614				Ref
7 August 2020	15	0	3153				Ref
8–10 August 2020	76	1	7819				Ref
11 August 2020	48	0	3402				Ref
12 August 2020	29	0	3572				Ref
13 August 2020	8	0	2179				Ref
14 August 2020	74	1	5597				Ref
15 August 2020	65	0	3797				Ref
16 August 2020	27	0	5658				Ref
17 August 2020	39	0	3340				Ref
18 August 2020	41	1	3850				Ref
19 August 2020	34	0	3088				Ref
20 August 2020	51	0	5177				Ref
21 August 2020	20	0	3465				Ref
22 August 2020	71	0	6647				Ref
23 August 2020	119	0	7646				Ref
24 August 2020	10	0	2926				Ref
25 August 2020	47	0	3371				Ref
26 August 2020	72	0	6410				Ref
27 August 2020	69	1	6979				Ref
28 August 2020	85	0	6325				Ref
29 August 2020	89	0	5735				Ref
30 August 2020	49	0	4848				Ref
31 August 2020	58	0	4951				Ref
1 September 2020	49	0	4350				Ref
2 September 2020	71	2	6053				Ref
3 September 2020	77	1	8013				Ref
4 September 2020	61	1	6369				Ref
5 September 2020	118	0	6305				Ref
6 September 2020	103	0	5030				Ref
7 September 2020	141	1	6992				Ref
8 September 2020	40	2	2845				Ref
9 September 2020	49	0	4461				Ref
10 September 2020	78	1	8543				Ref
11 September 2020	88	0	8142				Ref
12 September 2020	104	0	8553				Ref
13 September 2020	87	0	6237				Ref
14 September 2020	109	2	5512				Ref
15 September 2020	79	1	4398				Ref
16 September 2020	129	2	6779				Ref
17 September 2020	149	0	6662				Ref
18 September 2020	163	2	6509				Ref
19 September 2020	222	0	9124				Ref
20 September 2020	176	0	5764				Ref
21 September 2020	125	2	6455				Ref
22 September 2020	75	0	4495				Ref
23 September 2020	220	0	8071				Ref
24 September 2020	189	0	6276				Ref
25 September 2020	273	0	7410				Ref
26 September 2020	319	1	8664				Ref
27 September 2020	187	0	4726				Ref
28 September 2020	220	0	5724				Ref
29 September 2020	320	0	5319				Ref
30 September 2020	424	1	7943				Ref
1 October 2020	259	2	6043				Ref
2 October 2020	934	1	8681				Ref
3 October 2020	726	1	8412				Ref
4 October 2020	462	1	5674				Ref
5 October 2020	616	0	7514				Ref
6 October 2020	669	1	7304				Ref
7 October 2020	828	1	9794				Ref
8 October 2020	923	1	9931				Ref
9 October 2020	1080	0	10635				Ref
10 October 2020	902	0	10191				Ref
11 October 2020	1066	1	10361				Ref
12 October 2020	877	3	7124				Ref
13 October 2020	863	7	6514				Ref
14 October 2020	1217	4	10620				Ref
15 October 2020	763	4	8267				Ref
16 October 2020	1299	2	10994				Ref
17 October 2020	1031	2	7771				Ref
18 October 2020	1012	5	10632				Ref
19 October 2020	820	6	6122				Ref
20 October 2020	913	3	6680				Ref
21 October 2020	1039	5	9020				Ref
22 October 2020	1042	5	9321				Ref
23 October 2020	1252	5	9659				Ref
24 October 2020	923	6	7733				Ref
25 October 2020	896	8	7454				Ref
26 October 2020	727	5	4893				Ref
27 October 2020	722	13	7465				Ref
28 October 2020	840	9	7318				Ref
29 October 2020	822	8	8268				Ref
30 October 2020	566	9	7018				Ref
31 October 2020	649	11	7025				Ref
1 November 2020	685	8	5853				Ref
2 November 2020	493	8	4035				Ref
3 November 2020	570	6	4952				Ref
4 November 2020	679	10	4498				Ref
5 November 2020	516	12	6887				Ref
6 November 2020	595	8	7065				Ref
7 November 2020	528	15	6755				Ref
8 November 2020	420	7	5762				Ref
9 November 2020	471	10	4541				Ref
10 November 2020	514	11	4347				Ref
11 November 2020	791	8	9559				Ref
12 November 2020	548	15	7912				Ref
13 November 2020	607	11	7635				Ref
14 November 2020	511	10	7987				Ref
15 November 2020	472	9	6372				Ref
16 November 2020	331	14	3993				Ref
17 November 2020	549	9	5297				Ref
18 November 2020	518	11	7767				Ref
19 November 2020	487	12	8781				Ref
20 November 2020	369	12	8066				Ref
21 November 2020	357	10	7088				Ref
22 November 2020	342	10	5364				Ref
23 November 2020	280	3	3626				Ref
24 November 2020	79	11	1979				Ref
25 November 2020	533	7	9093				Ref
26 November 2020	442	8	9516				Ref
27 November 2020	391	12	8490				Ref
28 November 2020	315	9	5506				Ref
29 November 2020	351	3	4801				Ref
30 November 2020	290	10	3602				Ref
1 December 2020	391	15	5107				Ref
2 December 2020	419	4	8231				Ref
3 December 2020	456	11	9418				Ref
4 December 2020	449	6	8295				Ref
5 December 2020	451	7	7350				Ref
6 December 2020	419	11	5966				Ref
7 December 2020	397	9	4489				Ref
8 December 2020	351	14	5662				Ref
9 December 2020	483	12	8993				Ref
10 December 2020	441	14	8880				Ref
11 December 2020	538	12	9375				Ref
12 December 2020	476	9	7219				Ref
13 December 2020	483	4	5846				Ref
14 December 2020	419	5	4406				Ref
15 December 2020	486	6	5709				Ref
16 December 2020	510	8	8485				Ref
17 December 2020	656	12	10620				Ref
18 December 2020	510	12	6812				Ref
19 December 2020	640	17	10104				Ref
20 December 2020	505	13	6724				Ref
21 December 2020	555	7	6977				Ref
22 December 2020	439	16	5166				Ref
23 December 2020	787	21	9017				Ref
24 December 2020	655	15					
25 December 2020	362	6					
26 December 2020	744	8					
27 December 2020	1110	11					
28 December 2020	1227	8					
29 December 2020	1566	7	7507				Ref
30 December 2020	2143	6	10625				Ref
31 December 2020	1929	11	14845				Ref
1 January 2021	1684	11					
2 January 2021	1192	6					Ref
3 January 2021	1662	6	8524				Ref
4 January 2021	1801	12	8723				Ref
5 January 2021	1378	18	7673				Ref
6 January 2021	1985	13	13138				Ref
7 January 2021	1410	17	11165				Ref
8 January 2021	1500	20	15486				Ref
9 January 2021	1442	9	11830				Ref
10 January 2021	1112	17	7377				Ref
11 January 2021	759	16	5807	6182	1339		Ref
12 January 2021	1205	22	8080	7230	2552		Ref
13 January 2021	1145	19	10206	11284	1170		Ref
14 January 2021	973	16	11316	11866	254		Ref
15 January 2021	1052	26	12933	3339	210		Ref
16 January 2021	705	22	6823	2481	700		Ref
17 January 2021	822	25	7366	5330	842		Ref
18 January 2021	640	19	4673	7140	563		Ref
19 January 2021	713	24	6011	5579	381		Ref
20 January 2021	905	22	9738	5776	366		Ref
21 January 2021	732	21	11008	6827	184		Ref
22 January 2021	865	12	14258	3327	150		Ref
23 January 2021	670	12	7071	1278	27		Ref
24 January 2021	433	14	4410	3998	26		Ref
25 January 2021	422	17	4077	3675	82		Ref
26 January 2021	550	16	6338	4823	115		Ref
27 January 2021	527	16	6499	7144	1017		Ref
28 January 2021	592	13	11500	20847	143		Ref
29 January 2021	669	22	13297	7934	76		Ref
30 January 2021	445	17	5470	10536	177		Ref
31 January 2021	426	19	4781	7208	289		Ref
1 February 2021	314	11	3423	11620	270		Ref
2 February 2021	447	17	6104	13242	273		Ref
3 February 2021	504	11	9039	17064	384		Ref
4 February 2021	412	10	10311	11497	508		Ref
5 February 2021	506	16	12287	14657	484		Ref
6 February 2021	390	7	6686	6026	676		Ref
7 February 2021	334	9	4264	7563	256		Ref
8 February 2021	296	12	3813	14128	126		Ref
9 February 2021	275	10	4815	16052	183		Ref
10 February 2021	336	4	7982	20099	365		Ref
11 February 2021	253	9	8326	19567	415		Ref
12 February 2021	407	9	11470	14357	385		Ref
13 February 2021	303	10	6342	3330	39		Ref
14 February 2021	176	11	2907	6142	29		Ref
15 February 2021	234	4	2980	12264	196		Ref
16 February 2021	341	9	6699	8702	275		Ref
17 February 2021	297	6	6005	9360	536		Ref
18 February 2021	342	6	9232	8574	536		Ref
19 February 2021	313	5	11955	6774	372		Ref
20 February 2021	276	3	4868	3092	54		Ref
21 February 2021	263	4	4555	12021	−11		Ref
22 February 2021	187	4	3127	10099	281		Ref
23 February 2021	225	5	7316	10106	268		Ref
24 February 2021	260	2	6747	13358	292		Ref
25 February 2021	281	5	9261	13595	261		Ref
26 February 2021	241	2	11112	10490	718		Ref
27 February 2021	184	2	4266	5318	49		Ref
28 February 2021	136	3	3714	4404	532		Ref
1 March 2021	138	2	2926	11989	2173		Ref
2 March 2021	149	2	6228	7630	2492		Ref
3 March 2021	226	4	10289	11702	2277		Ref
4 March 2021	163	3	6221	11290	1648		Ref
5 March 2021	166	2	9188	9208	309		Ref
6 March 2021	172	4	7584	5695	134		Ref
7 March 2021	138	3	3368	5889	621		Ref
8 March 2021	144	2	2880	7724	1743		Ref
9 March 2021	240	2	7018	4574	2333		Ref
10 March 2021	147	8	8912	5594	2021		Ref
11 March 2021	223	9	10750	7934	452		Ref
12 March 2021	208	1	7835	6833	652		Ref
13 March 2021	146	1	4706	3733	2355		Ref
14 March 2021	143	0	3712	4266	2299		Ref
15 March 2021	121	1	3051	4558	3609		Ref
16 March 2021	164	1	6451	6782	5701		Ref
17 March 2021	161	0	8751	5389	3256		
18 March 2021	169	1	10554	9391	3507		Ref
19 March 2021	137	3	6580	7392	4604		Ref
20 March 2021	159	0	7064	4785	3183		Ref
21 March 2021	125	1	3748	19770	10187		Ref
22 March 2021	87	1	2846	5104	5242		Ref
23 March 2021	174	2	7940	5626	5928		Ref
24 March 2021	139	0	6228	8471	8653		Ref
25 March 2021	183	0	11993	8339	8730		Ref
26 March 2021	181	0	13175	7587	6712		Ref
27 March 2021	138	2	6022	7309	3103		Ref
28 March 2021	116	2	3836	3882	1565		Ref
29 March 2021	65	0	5507	10258	7005		Ref
30 March 2021	151	5	9088	8383	6464		Ref
31 March 2021	123	0	7038	6901	7267		Ref
1 April 2021	107	0	12046	8992	7701		Ref
2 April 2021	107	1	12157	7235	6808		
3 April 2021	84	1	5303	4868	2221		Ref
4 April 2021	56	1		2824	1335		
5 April 2021	39	1		5562	1556		
6 April 2021	60	2		5366	2549		
7 April 2021	88	0	7875	8550	5849		Ref
8 April 2021	98	2	6736	6595	8042		Ref
9 April 2021	113	2	10028	7463	7883		Ref
10 April 2021	146	3	9213	6564	4913		Ref
11 April 2021	89	1	4079	6380	4890		Ref
12 April 2021	97	0	11048	5483	10970		Ref
13 April 2021	112	0	9585	6154	13659		Ref
14 April 2021	97	1	7346	6235	13152		Ref
15 April 2021	159	2	15837	5819	13193		Ref
16 April 2021	119	1	12274	5723	12443		Ref
17 April 2021	99	2	8539	4487	5424		Ref
18 April 2021	82	0	4900	3399	5278		Ref
19 April 2021	79	0	10968	5630	9859		Ref
20 April 2021	124	1	10023	6948	15079		Ref
21 April 2021	116	1	8374	7523	13293		Ref
22 April 2021	120	3	8374	8974	16516		Ref
23 April 2021	88	1	12266	6071	10043		Ref
24 April 2021	80	1	9613	6878	3786		Ref
25 April 2021	73	0	5118	6708	4839		Ref
26 April 2021	73	1	10950	6848	9369		Ref
27 April 2021	109	0	10519	8364	11066		Ref
28 April 2021	98	1	10870	7933	9833		Ref
29 April 2021	95	0	15445	−8792	37582		Ref
30 April 2021	108	1	16068	5100	4697		Ref
1 May 2021	90	0		5356	4642		Ref
2 May 2021	69	1		5240	4997		Ref
3 May 2021	64	0		1672	5014		Ref
4 May 2021	83	0	9297	6084	9422		Ref
5 May 2021	99	0	14507	6285	13454		Ref
6 May 2021	102	0	11222	6252	13739		Ref
7 May 2021	65	1	12168	5071	8391		Ref
8 May 2021	81	0		4211	5931		Ref
9 May 2021	98	0		3895	5725		Ref
10 May 2021	76	0	9400	4656	9534		Ref
11 May 2021	89	1	8880	3970	11928		Ref
12 May 2021	113	0	9143	3561	11176		Ref
13 May 2021	99	1	20242	3113	11152		Ref
14 May 2021	96	0	11152	2071	8932		Ref
15 May 2021	60	0		1152	6156		
16 May 2021	65	0		1700	6796		
17 May 2021	82	1	7770	3323	7890		Ref
18 May 2021	104	2	10055	3142	7942		Ref
19 May 2021	107	0	13354	4519	8918		Ref
20 May 2021	90	0	13936	3247	8988		Ref
21 May 2021	84	0	13367	2212	9338		Ref
22 May 2021	82	0		3893	3909		
23 May 2021	77	0		4084	5852		Ref
24 May 2021	53	0	8945	4418	8700		Ref
25 May 2021	75	0	9350	4368	9406		Ref
26 May 2021	66	0	12280	3332	9713		Ref
27 May 2021	84	0	13608	3749	8635		Ref
28 May 2021	75	0	11451	2805	6106		Ref
29 May 2021	76	1		3450	3533		
30 May 2021	64	0		4203	3333		
31 May 2021	36	0		4800	5467		
1 June 2021	54	0	8999	8400	8618		Ref
2 June 2021	84	0	12257	12225	8823		Ref
3 June 2021	80	1	13898	5142	7808		Ref
4 June 2021	73	0	8819	4361	7112		Ref
5 June 2021	79	0		3858	4264		
6 June 2021	47	0		3557	6539		
7 June 2021	54	0	7531	3786	9679		Ref
8 June 2021	81	0	9504	4136	8200		Ref
9 June 2021	105	0	12859	3015	8190		Ref
10 June 2021	109	0	15966	4138	7212		Ref
11 June 2021	121	1	12085	7392	6418		Ref
12 June 2021	109	0		432	536		
13 June 2021	73	0					
14 June 2021	87	0	6837	2156	12068		Ref
15 June 2021	115	0	9798	10930	10509		Ref
16 June 2021	143	0	12514	1993	9636		Ref
17 June 2021	179	0	14728	3876	7502		Ref
18 June 2021	178	0	12583	2762	7323		Ref
19 June 2021	158	0		2470	5990		Ref
20 June 2021	125	0		3060	7021		Ref
21 June 2021	133	0	7690	2385	6773		Ref
22 June 2021	187	0	10101	3930	6730		Ref
23 June 2021	188	0	10957	3049	6598		Ref
24 June 2021	198	0	15158	2518	5658		Ref
25 June 2021	229	0	12591	2568	5502		Ref
26 June 2021	298	0		2203	3960		
27 June 2021	261	0		2533	4378		Ref
28 June 2021	211	0	7503	2431	5732		Ref
29 June 2021	278	0	10962	2337	7196		Ref
30 June 2021	375	0	9918	2050	8284		Ref
1 July 2021	326	0	11962	1897	6186		Ref
2 July 2021	339	1	11037	1817	6462		Ref
3 July 2021	460	0		1097	6471		Ref
4 July 2021	533	0		1712	6874		Ref
5 July 2021	420	0	8275	1786	7398		Ref
6 July 2021	417	0	12207	1985	7643		Ref
7 July 2021	570	0	10122	1960	7828		Ref
8 July 2021	627	0	12700	1912	6777		Ref
9 July 2021	605	0	11773	1764	6108		Ref
10 July 2021	445	1		1713	5514		Ref
11 July 2021	605	1		1204	3537		Ref
12 July 2021	528	0		606	1764		Ref
13 July 2021	511	0		1151	6367		Ref
14 July 2021	636	1	7775	1117	7091		Ref
15 July 2021	1083	0	12902	1300	6296		Ref
16 July 2021	1380	0	17245	11185	10466		Ref
17 July 2021	1402	2		983	4589		Ref
18 July 2021	537	1		-16162	3975		Ref
19 July 2021	1776	1	15381	1136	6096		Ref
20 July 2021	1138	1	12652	1664	6835		Ref
21 July 2021	1973	2	15684	2369	6176		Ref
22 July 2021	1430	0	15985	1143	1965		Ref
23 July 2021	1337	1	12996	1673	3091		Ref
24 July 2021	1520	1		1417	2181		Ref
25 July 2021	1264	2		1724	2565		Ref
26 July 2021	639	0	12861	1697	5220		Ref
27 July 2021	1473	3	14087	2770	5955		Ref
28 July 2021	1600	3	17520	7683	7861		Ref
29 July 2021	1471	2	20648	3091	5855		Ref
30 July 2021	1101	3	15251	3018	3903		Ref
31 July 2021	1177	8		3478	3644		Ref
1 August 2021	1072	5		657	4686		Ref
2 August 2021	872	5	9089	1041	7683		Ref
3 August 2021	1082	6	13980	1313	6519		Ref
4 August 2021	1040	1	12608	1560	6063		Ref
5 August 2021	1641	3	22512	1372	4482		Ref
6 August 2021	1434	4	17260	6431	6483		Ref
7 August 2021	1349	6		1344	4438		Ref
8 August 2021	1129	1		987	4959		Ref
9 August 2021	1031	8	11270	7374	5765		Ref
10 August 2021	1305	2	15122	2314	5249		Ref
11 August 2021	1467	3	17989	1687	4669		Ref
12 August 2021	1610	3	22615	2095	4788		Ref
13 August 2021	1389	4	16894	1510	4251		Ref
14 August 2021	1437	5		1162	2737		Ref
15 August 2021	1294	3		1603	3506		Ref
16 August 2021	1306	3	13557	1564	3749		Ref
17 August 2021	1564	7	15993	2566	5148		Ref
18 August 2021	1345	11	14907	1467	3862		Ref
19 August 2021	1963	9	20165	1861	3956		Ref
20 August 2021	2397	9	23123	1733	4021		Ref
21 August 2021	1612	4		4142	2783		Ref
22 August 2021	1485	11		3658	2310		Ref
23 August 2021	1320	9	11608	1893	1725		Ref
24 August 2021	1648	12	16462	2005	2382		Ref
25 August 2021	1771	5	17962	3483	2999		Ref
26 August 2021	1550	4	19788	3539	2436		Ref
27 August 2021	1875	5	25631	2153	1616		Ref
28 August 2021	1430	6		1164	1175		Ref
29 August 2021	1225	9		689	1407		Ref
30 August 2021	1259	6		1344	1677		Ref
31 August 2021	1313	6	14167	1582	2129		Ref
1 September 2021	1472	9	20449	1608	1760		Ref
2 September 2021	793	12	16293	1049	2252		Ref
3 September 2021	1248	9	17770	1378	1909		Ref
4 September 2021	1812	7		950	1647		Ref
5 September 2021	1232	7		934	2891		Ref
6 September 2021	1698	9	23943	893	3297		Ref
7 September 2021	1748	7	24501	872	4169		Ref
8 September 2021	1210	6	24714	1187	3500		Ref
9 September 2021	1831	8	33826	1175	3540		Ref
10 September 2021	1687	6	34609	759	4116		Ref
11 September 2021	1424	3		398	2226		Ref
12 September 2021	1031	6		654	1131		Ref
13 September 2021	1199	8	22456	1074	1505		Ref
14 September 2021	1199	7	24396	1427	1091		Ref
15 September 2021	1199	10	22808	1686	569		Ref
16 September 2021	1071	5	23820	1820	741		Ref
17 September 2021	1239	10	27978	676	530		Ref
18 September 2021	1072	6		434	170		Ref
19 September 2021	889	5		557	468		Ref
20 September 2021	1020	5	19284	770	583		Ref
21 September 2021	1145	4	20619	496	654		Ref
22 September 2021	1060	4	19489	744	806		Ref
23 September 2021	1165	8	25614	871	547		Ref
24 September 2021	1030	8	20651	803	342		Ref
25 September 2021	1120	5		674	432		Ref
26 September 2021	1030	6		521	604		Ref
27 September 2021	903	4	15420	748	1120		Ref
28 September 2021	1078	4	16818	669	757		Ref
29 September 2021	1320	2	21429	766	882		Ref
30 September 2021	1163	8	22742	777	864		Ref
1 October 2021	1039	2	20387	297	896	752	Ref
2 October 2021	992	1		117	897	702	Ref
3 October 2021	892	2		170	1228	1285	Ref
4 October 2021	1080	3	15743	305	1438	1519	Ref
5 October 2021	1209	3	18676	207	1340	1957	Ref
6 October 2021	1339	2	19497	288	847	1710	Ref
7 October 2021	1305	4	22421	388	1253	1575	Ref
8 October 2021	1276	2	20378	291	1001	1283	Ref
9 October 2021	1274	4		55	944	731	Ref
10 October 2021	1115	3		80	589	1598	Ref
11 October 2021	1109	5	14598	232	862	2818	Ref
12 October 2021	1278	6	16728	400	1085	3308	Ref
13 October 2021	1471	1	20026	303	740	1799	Ref
14 October 2021	1304	6	21105	477	1312	3736	Ref
15 October 2021	1349	4	22876	272	702	1342	Ref
16 October 2021	1218	4		59	660	720	Ref
17 October 2021	966	4		170	351	1232	Ref
18 October 2021	1091	3	14480	485	440	2625	Ref
19 October 2021	1367	8	18831	742	8677	5582	Ref
20 October 2021	1423	6	25341	365	1315	4014	Ref
21 October 2021	1051	4	16279	411	1873	4407	Ref
22 October 2021	1355	7	20016	547	961	3609	Ref
23 October 2021	1323	10		751	530	2301	Ref
24 October 2021	1061	5		520	607	2633	Ref
25 October 2021	1019	4	11661	950	773	5572	Ref
26 October 2021	1124	4	12816	1456	835	5915	Ref
27 October 2021	1291	6	16843	1554	863	6786	Ref
28 October 2021	1122	9	18005	1753	734	5058	Ref
29 October 2021	1321	7	19391	967	673	3767	Ref
30 October 2021	1207	8		807	550	2076	Ref
31 October 2021	1001	6		605	435	2824	Ref
1 November 2021	948	10	14813	474	844	7656	Ref
2 November 2021	1114	2	19105	701	852	8730	Ref
3 November 2021	995	9	18590	1089	547	10433	Ref
4 November 2021	1481	12	27439	1894	1247	9879	Ref
5 November 2021	1164	4	20847	669	989	6254	Ref
6 November 2021	1194	6		517	364	5840	Ref
7 November 2021	1035	4		891	800	4200	Ref
8 November 2021	1028	11	15391	1364	1131	10253	Ref
9 November 2021	1228	7	20248	1790	879	12269	Ref
10 November 2021	1765	7	25974	1810	1084	14947	Ref
11 November 2021	1462	6	23373	2058	1332	13526	Ref
12 November 2021	1087	2	21764	795	666	9728	Ref
13 November 2021	1806	3	23558	485	297	5354	Ref
14 November 2021	1377	5	15713	1024	537	5190	Ref
15 November 2021	1451	5	19755	2233	864	13566	Ref
16 November 2021	1698	5	24092	1946	896	15225	Ref
17 November 2021	1848	12	26776	2760	1227	18090	Ref
18 November 2021	1681	6	26827	2473	940	15791	Ref
19 November 2021	1690	7	28316	982	702	9837	Ref
20 November 2021	1846	7	24448	411	434	4609	Ref
21 November 2021	1406	6	18606	558	740	6902	Ref
22 November 2021	1469	3	19882	1350	1144	14512	Ref
23 November 2021	1476	4	21950	1711	1173	16359	Ref
24 November 2021	1931	4	28807	1542	1316	15323	Ref
25 November 2021	1549	5	28526	1420	1286	13019	Ref
26 November 2021	2004	9	33611	0	0	0	Ref
27 November 2021	1482	2	23699	0	0	0	Ref
28 November 2021	1405	2	19887	4815	3819	17199	Ref
29 November 2021	1464	4	21469	1615	1304	15707	Ref
30 November 2021	1585	2	24469	1774	1294	15124	Ref
1 December 2021	1992	4	32548	1856	1262	16033	Ref
2 December 2021	2272	2	39503	1614	1395	14753	Ref
3 December 2021	1908	4	35416	941	749	6936	Ref
4 December 2021	1642	9		0	0	0	Ref
5 December 2021	1422	7		3154	2215	21846	Ref
6 December 2021	1635	1	25905	1030	1051	10118	Ref
7 December 2021	1658	5	26602	1347	894	13486	Ref
8 December 2021	1933	5	33993	1626	1050	14389	Ref
9 December 2021	1819	4	35790	1541	973	13109	Ref
10 December 2021	1806	2	38674	1055	847	11244	Ref
11 December 2021	1446	3	35530	561	539	6581	Ref
12 December 2021	1548	3	34826	936	591	8150	Ref
13 December 2021	1431	4	29314	1273	1216	22901	Ref
14 December 2021	1581	4	30675	968	835	22522	Ref
15 December 2021	2156	4	41119	1116	1186	27689	Ref
16 December 2021	2237	6	46800	982	1350	24100	Ref
17 December 2021	1887	3	46477	936	872	17068	Ref
18 December 2021	2075	5	55827	578	569	10114	Ref
19 December 2021	1798	2	49783	558	610	14758	Ref
20 December 2021	2148	1	39442	1113	1123	29016	Ref
21 December 2021	2096	3	37978	792	1030	30803	Ref
22 December 2021	3231	3	47559	1140	863	24424	Ref
23 December 2021	3227	1	50498	555	483	14948	Ref
24 December 2021	3286	3	49018	40	23	2722	Ref
28 December 2021				591	279	6077	
29 December 2021	22972	14	222100	849	432	7777	Ref
30 December 2021	4701	3	42018	496	558	10903	Ref
31 December 2021	7792	1	51201	636	496	10975	Ref
1 January 2022				71	68	979	
2 January 2022				324	283	3251	
3 January 2022				401	421	4693	
4 January 2022	30423	15	95066	520	609	7010	Ref
5 January 2022	7133	3	51891	3770	1801	6396	Ref
6 January 2022	6877	4	51009	503	629	8899	Ref
7 January 2022	6444	0	51642	641	539	7757	Ref
8 January 2022	3458	5	40638	0	0	0	Ref
9 January 2022	3760	2	47470	973	606	6867	Ref
10 January 2022	2706	6	33564	428	402	6748	Ref
11 January 2022	3420	1	37056	623	425	6530	Ref
12 January 2022	2922	2	31805	665	438	8193	Ref
13 January 2022	2980	14	36777	782	634	5583	Ref
14 January 2022	2954	4	38485	569	474	5116	Ref
15 January 2022	2668	0	34546	429	567	2501	Ref
16 January 2022	2518	3	34542	365	509	1313	
17 January 2022	3295	4	32760	577	501	4093	Ref
18 January 2022	4081	6	38070	496	503	3956	Ref
19 January 2022	4451	6	39468	183	630	4215	Ref
20 January 2022	3879	2	39679	385	557	3892	Ref
21 January 2022	3568	6	36248	461	698	3248	Ref
22 January 2022	3476	5	35541	360	659	1129	Ref
23 January 2022	3059	5	34016	402	693	868	Ref
24 January 2022	3932	1	32561	207	347	1709	Ref
25 January 2022	5023	5	40624	209	427	2142	Ref
26 January 2022	4384	9	35755	309	601	2293	Ref
27 January 2022	4243	6	40249	396	649	2406	Ref
28 January 2022	3737	8	33300	262	451	1998	Ref
29 January 2022	3590	3	32555	475	701	1318	Ref
30 January 2022	3069	6	25550	232	439	745	Ref
31 January 2022	4159	3	32849	139	262	1176	Ref
1 February 2022	4622	4	35052	188	248	1746	Ref
2 February 2022	4769	5	40629	168	436	1708	Ref
3 February 2022	4203	3	36273	200	434	2057	Ref
4 February 2022	3833	1	34638	238	395	1586	Ref
5 February 2022	3201	3	29323	289	549	1245	Ref
6 February 2022	2694	1	24156	404	474	1057	Ref
7 February 2022	3105	2	25247	193	268	1906	Ref
8 February 2022	3959	6	32709	179	231	1785	Ref
9 February 2022	3837	2	32638	-676	30	2035	Ref
10 February 2022	3609	7	33150	485	730	2115	Ref
11 February 2022	2923	4	27386	128	503	1680	Ref
12 February 2022	2633	1	25004	176	484	790	Ref
13 February 2022	2158	4	20395	231	498	675	Ref
14 February 2022	2465	2	19747	127	318	1826	Ref
15 February 2022	2987	4	26136	113	316	1652	Ref
16 February 2022	2889	5	24641	148	425	2046	Ref
17 February 2022	3027	1	26099	172	389	1702	Ref
18 February 2022	2469	4	21811	169	567	1266	Ref
19 February 2022	2147	5	15997	222	434	911	Ref
20 February 2022	1865	5	22202	170	388	598	Ref
21 February 2022	2235	4	13475	80	151	829	Ref
22 February 2022	2951	5	16014	49	235	1344	Ref
23 February 2022	2294	4	19778	114	259	1412	Ref
24 February 2022	2486	2	21334	65	220	1292	Ref
25 February 2022	2068	2	18296	138	283	1371	Ref
26 February 2022	1708	8	14974	169	444	734	Ref
27 February 2022	1552	3	12185	217	490	618	Ref
28 February 2022	1908	1	13957	101	242	925	Ref

March 2022
Date	Cases reported	Deaths reported	Tests	Vaccine 1st Dose	Vaccine 2nd Dose	Vaccine 3rd Dose	Reference
1 March 2022	2567	5	20735	109	314	850	Ref
2 March 2022	2407	4	18137	231	218	1224	Ref
3 March 2022	2408	3	19422	0	0	0	Ref
4 March 2022	2236	3	18776	361	435	1973	Ref
5 March 2022	1991	3	15035	230	337	525	Ref
6 March 2022	1725	4	11190	255	262	386	Ref
7 March 2022	2052	2	13711	144	235	739	Ref
8 March 2022	2669	5	19464	128	235	674	Ref
9 March 2022	2683	4	19739	93	234	990	Ref
10 March 2022	2602	4	20295	158	302	836	Ref
11 March 2022	2270	1	17472	108	225	682	Ref
12 March 2022	2032	4	15112	192	377	1135	Ref
13 March 2022	1669	2	11271	228	282	325	Ref
14 March 2022	1822	1	13030	82	206	975	Ref
15 March 2022	2605	5	19266	46	165	787	Ref
16 March 2022	2391	5	18145	110	271	828	Ref
17 March 2022	2054	3	17458	174	186	300	Ref
18 March 2022	1798	0	13962	174	320	762	Ref
19 March 2022	1708	6	13529	185	326	414	Ref
20 March 2022	1604	3	10886	204	299	330	Ref
21 March 2022	2007	1	13196	57	103	878	Ref
22 March 2022	2899	8	19041	104	291	998	Ref
23 March 2022	2269	3	16399	136	249	899	Ref
24 March 2022	2524	2	19530	57	141	462	Ref
25 March 2022	1910	5	15058	125	228	765	Ref
26 March 2022	1465	7	12224	175	415	490	Ref
27 March 2022	1172	2	9149	201	273	320	Ref
28 March 2022	1204	5	10461	78	100	451	Ref
29 March 2022	1731	9	17947	28	208	391	Ref
30 March 2022	1414	5	14774	99	334	638	Ref
31 March 2022	1461	3	15671	97	251	525	Ref
Total	686,839	3323	8,714,191	1,423,873	1,331,316	1,002,173	

- Total amount of tests will not add up to the total of daily tests listed above as test numbers are not always announced on a daily basis, however when they are a new overall total is announced as well.
- Some data is taken from the Department of Health COVID-19 dashboard which updates daily.

== Changes in birth patterns ==
A study using data from the Northern Ireland Statistics and Research Agency found that the sex ratio at birth—normally around 51% male—fell unusually low, to 49.13%, in August 2020 and rose unusually high, to 54.48%, in December 2020, around five and nine months after the COVID-19 pandemic was declared—patterns that may be associated with early pandemic-related stress and changes in sexual behaviour during lockdown respectfully, and which resembled those seen in England and Wales but not in the Republic of Ireland.

== See also ==
- COVID-19 pandemic in the United Kingdom
  - COVID-19 pandemic in England
  - COVID-19 pandemic in Scotland
  - COVID-19 pandemic in Wales
  - COVID-19 pandemic in London
- COVID-19 pandemic in the Republic of Ireland
- Caroline McElnay, the County Antrim native directing New Zealand's battle against the virus
