= Joel Cooper (footballer) =

Northern Irish footballer (born 1996)

Personal information
- Full name: Joel William Cooper
- Date of birth: 29 February 1996 (age 30)
- Place of birth: Ballyclare, Northern Ireland
- Height: 5 ft 11 in (1.80 m)
- Position: Winger

Team information
- Current team: Coleraine
- Number: 11

Youth career
- Ballyclare Colts

Senior career*
| Years | Team | Apps | (Gls) |
| 2013–2015 | Ballyclare Comrades | 46 | (8) |
| 2015–2018 | Glenavon | 80 | (13) |
| 2018–2020 | Linfield | 62 | (18) |
| 2020–2022 | Oxford United | 6 | (0) |
| 2021 | → Linfield (loan) | 20 | (3) |
| 2022 | → Port Vale (loan) | 6 | (0) |
| 2022–2025 | Linfield | 93 | (42) |
| 2025– | Coleraine | 37 | (21) |

International career
| 2015–2017 | Northern Ireland U21 | 5 | (0) |
- * Club domestic league appearances and goals as of 12:10, 26 April 2026 (UTC)

Joel William Cooper (born 29 February 1996) is a Northern Irish professional footballer who plays as a winger for NIFL Premiership club Coleraine.

Cooper began his career with his local NIFL Championship club Ballyclare Comrades, playing 49 games before joining Glenavon in the NIFL Premiership in 2015. He won the Irish Cup and NIFL Charity Shield with Glenavon and was named as Northern Ireland Young Player of the Year for the 2015–16 season. He signed with Linfield in 2018. He won two Irish Premiership titles and an Irish League Cup title, as well as the Northern Ireland Football Writers' Association Player of the Year award for the 2019–20 season. He moved to the English Football League after signing with Oxford United for an undisclosed fee in July 2020. However, he spent the second half of the 2020–21 season back on loan at Linfield, where he would win another Irish Premiership and Irish Cup title. He joined Port Vale on loan for the second half of the 2021–22 season.

He returned to Northern Ireland and re-joined Linfield in May 2022, helping them to win the Northern Ireland Football League Cup in 2023 and 2024. He won the Ulster Footballer of the Year and Northern Ireland Football Writers' Association Player of the Year award as Linfield won the 2024–25 league title. He signed with Coleraine in June 2025 and won the Irish Cup with the club the following year.

== Club career ==
=== Ballyclare Comrades ===
Cooper started his career playing on the left-side of a 4–4–2 at Ballyclare Comrades after being brought to Dixon Park from Ballyclare Colts by Stephen Hughes. He made a total of 20 appearances under Eddie Hill in the 2013–14 season and scored eight goals in 29 games in the 2014–15 campaign as the Comrades posted mid-table finishes in the NIFL Championship. He spent a week on trial at Scottish League One club Stranraer in July 2015.

=== Glenavon ===
Cooper was signed to Glenavon as manager Gary Hamilton "felt he had everything to step up a level" into the NIFL Premiership. In his first season at the club, he helped them reach the Irish Cup final at Windsor Park on 7 May 2016; Cooper started the match as Glenavon defeated favourites Linfield 2–0. At the end of the 2015–16 season, Cooper was named the Northern Ireland Young Player of the Year after scoring eight goals and providing 20 assists for the "Lurgan Blues".

Glenavon won the NIFL Charity Shield on 30 July 2016 after beating league champions Crusaders 1–0 at Mourneview Park. Cooper scored seven goals in 41 appearances as Glenavon posted a sixth-place finish at the end of the 2016–17 season. His departure from the club was announced in August 2017 as he accepted a scholarship offer from the University of New Hampshire in the United States. However, he did not end up taking the scholarship and returned to Glenavon, scoring two goals in 17 games during the 2017–18 season.

=== Linfield ===
On 24 January 2018, Cooper agreed to a pre-contract deal with Linfield, with a three-year contract due to start ahead of the 2018–19 season. He was utilised as part of an interchangeable three behind the striker in a 4–2–3–1 system and scored seven goals in 33 league games as Linfield won the Premiership title at the end of the 2018–19 season. He also featured in the first leg of the Champions Cup, a 1–1 draw with Dundalk at Windsor Park, but missed the second leg with a nose injury; Dundalk won the return fixture 6–0. The "Blues" also finished as runners-up in the County Antrim Shield, losing 4–3 to Crusaders.

In his second season with Linfield, Cooper scored 11 league goals and provided a further 17 assists, as the club were crowned 2019–20 league champions. In addition to 33 domestic appearances, he also featured five times in the UEFA Europa League, where Linfield reached the final round of qualification before losing to Qarabağ on the Away goals rule. He was named as Northern Ireland Football Writers' Association Player of the Year; Cooper said "It's been a crazy few months for me and while 2020 probably hasn't been a great year for a lot of people it's been brilliant for me".

=== Oxford United ===
On 23 July 2020, Cooper signed a three-year contract with Oxford United in League One after joining for an undisclosed fee. Cooper became the third player from an Irish league side to join Oxford, following in the footsteps of Gavin Whyte and Mark Sykes. Cooper made his Oxford debut on 12 September, coming on as a second-half substitute in a 2–0 defeat at Lincoln City in the first match of the 2020–21 season. He made his full debut for Oxford at the Kassam Stadium three days later in an EFL Cup match against Watford, providing the assist for Robert Hall's goal, though the "U's" would lose in a penalty shoot-out after the match finished 1–1. Cooper returned home to Northern Ireland in November to deal with ongoing personal issues and manager Karl Robinson looked to secure him a loan move to maintain his fitness as the issues at home required Cooper's continued presence.

Speaking in August 2021, Robinson confirmed that the personal issues had been resolved and that Cooper was ready to play for Oxford again. However, he played just two League One and three EFL Trophy games, scoring twice against Tottenham Hotspur U21s. On 9 May 2022, the club announced that Cooper would leave at the end of the 2021–22 season and "will now return to Northern Ireland as a free agent having reached agreement with the U's to terminate his contract".

==== Loan to Linfield ====
In December 2020, it was announced that Cooper would return to Linfield on loan for the remainder of the 2020–21 season once the January transfer window opened. However, despite having three weeks' notice, the Irish Football Association failed to complete his registration in time to play on 23 January, much to manager David Healy's frustration. On 21 May 2021, Cooper scored the winning goal for Linfield as the club defeated Larne in the Irish Cup final to claim a league and cup double.

==== Loan to Port Vale ====
On 27 January 2022, Cooper joined League Two side Port Vale on loan until the end of the 2021–22 season. He made his debut at Vale Park as a late substitute on 29 January and would make a further five appearances – all away from home – between then and 5 March.

=== Return to Linfield ===
On 24 May 2022, Cooper returned to NIFL Premiership side Linfield on a three-year contract. He was named as Northern Ireland Football Writers' Association Player of the Month after scoring six goals in March, including four against Newry City. He scored the opening goal of the 2023 Northern Ireland Football League Cup final, which Linfield won 2–0 against Coleraine. He scored 16 goals from 42 appearances in the 2022–23 season. He scored 14 goals from 38 appearances in the 2023–24 campaign. He was rated as one of the top performers in the league for the first half of the season and one solo goal he scored against Glenavon was described as "Messi-esque" by ITV. Four of his goals came in the club's run to the final of the Northern Ireland Football League Cup, which they went on to win by beating Portadown. Linfield also reached the final of the Irish Cup, but lost 3–1 to Cliftonville after extra-time.

Cooper was the subject of transfer speculation in December 2024 with reports saying that he had signed a pre-contract agreement with Coleraine. Coleraine had recently enjoyed "significant investment" from local property developer Henry Ross. Linfield manager David Healy would only state that any club wanting to buy the player in the January transfer window would have to pay a £1 million transfer fee. Cooper said that he was "fully focused" on winning the league title with Linfield after he was named Northern Ireland Football Writers' Player of the Month for January. Linfield ran away with the league title with Cooper being their star player as they were crowned champions with six games left to play. He became only the fourth player to win a second Northern Ireland Football Writers' Association Player of the Year award. He also won the Ulster Footballer of the Year award for the first time.

=== Coleraine ===
Following months of speculation, Cooper signed a "multi-year deal" with Coleraine on 4 June 2025. Manager Ruaidhrí Higgins said Cooper would take the club "to the next level". He scored 21 goals in 37 league games throughout the 2025–26 campaign. This tally included a hat-trick against Cliftonville. He also scored in the Irish Cup final win over Dungannon Swifts.

== International career ==
Cooper was called up to the Northern Ireland under-21 squad by manager Jim Magilton in August 2015, at which point he had acquired the nickname of the 'Mourneview Messi'. He won a total of five youth team caps. In August 2020, Cooper was called up by manager Ian Baraclough to join the Northern Ireland senior squad for UEFA Nations League matches against Romania and Norway in September. Speaking in April 2025, he stated that not winning a senior cap was his only regret in football.

== Style of play ==
Cooper is a versatile winger who can play on either flank.

== Career statistics ==
As of match played 2 May 2026

Appearances and goals by club, season and competition
| Club | Season | League | | | National cup (Note: Includes Irish Cup, FA Cup) | | League cup (Note: Includes Northern Ireland Football League Cup, Football League Cup) | | Other | | Total | |
| Club | Season | Division | Apps | Goals | Apps | Goals | Apps | Goals | Apps | Goals | Apps | Goals |
|---|---|---|---|---|---|---|---|---|---|---|---|---|
| Ballyclare Comrades | 2013–14 | NIFL Championship | 20 | 1 | 0 | 0 | 0 | 0 | – | | 20 | 1 |
| Ballyclare Comrades | 2014–15 | NIFL Championship | 26 | 7 | 1 | 0 | 1 | 0 | 1 (Note: Appearance in Irish Intermediate Cup) | 1 | 29 | 8 |
| Ballyclare Comrades | Total | | 46 | 8 | 1 | 0 | 1 | 0 | 1 | 1 | 49 | 9 |
| Glenavon | 2015–16 | NIFL Premiership | 31 | 6 | 4 | 1 | 0 | 0 | – | | 35 | 7 |
| Glenavon | 2016–17 | NIFL Premiership | 34 | 5 | 3 | 2 | 1 | 0 | 3 (Note: One appearance in NIFL Charity Shield, two appearances in UEFA Europa League) | 0 | 41 | 7 |
| Glenavon | 2017–18 | NIFL Premiership | 15 | 2 | 2 | 0 | 0 | 0 | — | | 17 | 2 |
| Glenavon | Total | | 80 | 13 | 9 | 3 | 1 | 0 | 3 | 0 | 93 | 16 |
| Linfield | 2018–19 | NIFL Premiership | 33 | 7 | 1 | 0 | 2 | 0 | — | | 36 | 7 |
| Linfield | 2019–20 | NIFL Premiership | 29 | 11 | 0 | 0 | 3 | 2 | 6 (Note: Five appearances in UEFA Europa League, one appearance in Champions Cup) | 2 | 38 | 15 |
| Linfield | Total | | 62 | 18 | 1 | 0 | 5 | 2 | 6 | 2 | 74 | 22 |
| Oxford United | 2020–21 | League One | 4 | 0 | 1 | 0 | 1 | 0 | 1 (Note: Appearance in the EFL Trophy) | 0 | 7 | 0 |
| Oxford United | 2021–22 | League One | 2 | 0 | 0 | 0 | 0 | 0 | 3 | 2 | 5 | 2 |
| Oxford United | Total | | 6 | 0 | 1 | 0 | 1 | 0 | 4 | 2 | 12 | 2 |
| Linfield (loan) | 2020–21 | NIFL Premiership | 20 | 3 | 5 | 1 | 0 | 0 | — | | 23 | 4 |
| Port Vale (loan) | 2021–22 | League Two | 6 | 0 | — | | — | | — | | 6 | 0 |
| Linfield | 2022–23 | NIFL Premiership | 33 | 12 | 1 | 0 | 4 | 3 | 2 | 1 | 42 | 16 |
| Linfield | 2023–24 | NIFL Premiership | 30 | 11 | 4 | 1 | 4 | 2 | 0 | 0 | 38 | 14 |
| Linfield | 2024–25 | NIFL Premiership | 30 | 19 | 0 | 0 | 1 | 0 | 2 (Note: Two appearances in UEFA Conference League) | 0 | 33 | 19 |
| Linfield | Total | | 93 | 42 | 5 | 1 | 9 | 5 | 4 | 1 | 113 | 49 |
| Coleraine | 2025–26 | NIFL Premiership | 37 | 21 | 4 | 4 | 1 | 1 | 0 | 0 | 42 | 26 |
| Coleraine | 2026–27 | NIFL Premiership | 0 | 0 | 0 | 0 | 0 | 0 | 0 | 0 | 0 | 0 |
| Coleraine | Total | | 37 | 21 | 4 | 4 | 1 | 1 | 0 | 0 | 42 | 26 |
| Career total | | | 350 | 105 | 26 | 9 | 18 | 8 | 18 | 6 | 412 | 128 |

== Honours ==
Glenavon

- Irish Cup: 2015–16
- NIFL Charity Shield: 2016

Linfield

- NIFL Premiership: 2018–19, 2019–20, 2020–21, 2024–25
- Irish Cup: 2020–21; runner-up: 2023–24
- County Antrim Shield runner-up: 2018–19
- Champions Cup runner-up: 2019
- Northern Ireland Football League Cup: 2023, 2024

Coleraine

- Irish Cup: 2025–26

Individual

- Northern Ireland Young Player of the Year: 2015–16
- Northern Ireland Football Writers' Association Player of the Year: 2019–20, 2024–25
- Northern Ireland Football Writers' Association Player of the Month: March 2023, January 2025
- Ulster Footballer of the Year: 2024–25
