= Northern Ireland Football Writers' Association Player of the Year =

Annual award in Northern Ireland

The Northern Ireland Football Writers' Association Player of the Year (often called the NIFWA Player of the Year) is an annual award given to the player who is adjudged to have been the best of the season in the NIFL Premiership. It is one of two association football Player of the Year awards in Northern Ireland, with the other being the Ulster Footballer of the Year award.

The award has been presented since the 1969–70 season and the winner is chosen by a vote amongst members of the association. The first winner of the award was Des Dickson of Coleraine. The player to have received the award more than any other is Glenn Ferguson, who has collected the award on three occasions, the last of which was in 2006. Two other players have won the award twice; Ivan Murray was the first in 1975 and Vinny Arkins was the most recent, in 2002.

== List of winners ==
Year	Player	Nationality	Club	Also won^{[A]}	Notes	Refs^{[B]}
1969–70	Des Dickson	Northern Ireland	Coleraine	—	—	—
1970–71	Bryan Hamilton	Northern Ireland	Linfield	UFY	—	—
1971–72	Billy Humphries	Northern Ireland	Ards	UFY	—	—
1972–73	John McPolin	Northern Ireland	Crusaders	—	—	—
1973–74	Ivan Murray	Northern Ireland	Coleraine	—	—	—
1974–75	Ivan Murray (2)	Northern Ireland	Coleraine	—	^{[C]}	—
1975–76	Warren Feeney	Northern Ireland	Glentoran	UFY	—	—
1976–77	Billy Caskey	Northern Ireland	Glentoran	—	—	—
1977–78	Jim Martin	Northern Ireland	Linfield	UFY	—	—
1978–79	Ray McGuigan	Northern Ireland	Glenavon	—	—	—
1979–80	Lindsay McKeown	Northern Ireland	Linfield	UFY	—	—
1980–81	Gary Blackledge	Northern Ireland	Glentoran	—	—	—
1981–82	Felix Healy	Northern Ireland	Coleraine	UFY	—	—
1982–83	George Dunlop	Northern Ireland	Linfield	—	—	—
1983–84	Billy Murray	Northern Ireland	Linfield	—	—	—
1984–85	Martin McGaughey	Northern Ireland	Linfield	UFY	—	—
1985–86	Trevor Anderson	Northern Ireland	Linfield	—	—	—
1986–87	Damien Byrne	Republic of Ireland	Ards	—	—	—
1987–88	Alan Paterson	Northern Ireland	Glentoran	UFY	—	—
1988–89	Marty Magee	Northern Ireland	Portadown	—	—	—
1989–90	Ollie Ralph	Republic of Ireland	Newry Town	UFY	—	—
1990–91	Stephen McBride	Northern Ireland	Glenavon	UFY	—	—
1991–92	Raymond Morrison	Northern Ireland	Glentoran	UFY	—	—
1992–93	Paul Byrne	Republic of Ireland	Bangor	—	—	—
1993–94	Noel Bailie	Northern Ireland	Linfield	UFY	—	—
1994–95	Kevin McKeown	Scotland	Crusaders	UFY	—	—
1995–96	Peter Kennedy	Northern Ireland	Portadown	UFY	—	—
1996–97	Stephen Baxter	Northern Ireland	Crusaders	UFY	—	—
1997–98	Marty Tabb	Northern Ireland	Cliftonville	UFY	—	—
1998–99	John Devine	Northern Ireland	Glentoran	UFY	—	—
1999–00	Vinny Arkins	Republic of Ireland	Portadown	UFY	—	—
2000–01	Glenn Ferguson	Northern Ireland	Linfield	UFY	—	
2001–02	Vinny Arkins (2)	Republic of Ireland	Portadown	—	^{[C]}	
2002–03	Gary Smyth	Northern Ireland	Glentoran	UFY	—	
2003–04	Glenn Ferguson (2)	Northern Ireland	Linfield	UFY	—	
2004–05	Mark Glendinning	Northern Ireland	Glentoran	—	—	
2005–06	Glenn Ferguson (3)	Northern Ireland	Linfield	UFY	^{[D]}	
2006–07	William Murphy	Northern Ireland	Linfield	UFY	—	
2007–08	Michael Gault	Northern Ireland	Linfield	—	—	
2008–09	Chris Scannell	Northern Ireland	Cliftonville	UFY	—	
2009–10	Rory Patterson	Northern Ireland	Coleraine	UFY	—	
2010–11	Stuart Dallas	Northern Ireland	Crusaders		—	
2011–12	Chris Morrow	Northern Ireland	Crusaders		—	
2012–13	Liam Boyce	Northern Ireland	Cliftonville	UFY	—	
2013–14	Joe Gormley	Northern Ireland	Cliftonville	UFY	—	
2014–15	Paul Heatley	Northern Ireland	Crusaders	UFY	—	
2015–16	Billy Joe Burns	Northern Ireland	Crusaders	UFY	—	
2016–17	Jamie Mulgrew	Northern Ireland	Linfield	UFY	—	
2017–18	Gavin Whyte	Northern Ireland	Crusaders	UFY	—	
2018–19	Jimmy Callacher	Northern Ireland	Linfield	UFY	—	—
2019–20	Joel Cooper	Northern Ireland	Linfield		—	
2020–21	Shayne Lavery	Northern Ireland	Linfield	UFY	—	
2021–22	Chris Shields	Republic of Ireland	Linfield	UFY	—	
2022–23	Leroy Millar	Northern Ireland	Larne	UFY	—	
2023–24	Kyle McClean	Northern Ireland	Linfield	UFY	—	
2024–25	Joel Cooper (2)	Northern Ireland	Linfield	UFY	—	
2025–26	Matt Ridley	England	Larne	—	—	

=== Wins by player (multiple) ===
Player	Total	Years
(Northern Ireland) Glenn Ferguson	3	2001, 2004, 2006
(Northern Ireland) Ivan Murray	2	1974, 1975
(Republic of Ireland) Vinny Arkins	2	2000, 2002
(Northern Ireland) Joel Cooper	2	2020, 2025

=== Wins by country ===
Club	Players	Total
Northern Ireland	43	48
Republic of Ireland	5	6
England	1	1
Scotland	1	1

=== Wins by club ===
Club	Players	Total
Linfield	17	20
Crusaders	8	8
Glentoran	8	8
Coleraine	4	5
Cliftonville	4	4
Portadown	3	4
Ards	2	2
Glenavon	2	2
Larne	2	2
Bangor	1	1
Newry Town	1	1

== See also ==
- Ulster Footballer of the Year

== Footnotes ==
A.: Player also won the Ulster Footballer of the Year award.
B.: Sourced to the official website of the Northern Ireland Football Writers' Association unless otherwise stated.
C. ^{a} ^{b} : Won the award on two occasions.
D.: Won the award three times.
