= 1989–90 County Antrim Shield =

Tournament details
- Country: Northern Ireland
- Teams: 16

Final positions
- Champions: Glentoran (20th win)
- Runners-up: Linfield

Tournament statistics
- Matches played: 15
- Goals scored: 42 (2.8 per match)

The 1989–90 County Antrim Shield was the 101st edition of the County Antrim Shield, a cup competition in Northern Irish football.

Glentoran won the tournament for the 20th time, defeating Linfield 6–5 on penalties after the final had finished 0-0. For the 4th year running the County Antrim FA invited three clubs from County Armagh to compete (Glenavon, Newry Town and Portadown).

== Results ==
=== First round ===
Team 1	Score	Team 2
Ards	1–1 (a.e.t.) (4–5 p)	East Belfast
Carrick Rangers	0–1	Bangor
Distillery	4–2	Portadown
Glenavon	3–2	Cliftonville
Glentoran	3–0	Harland & Wolff Welders
Larne	1–0	Cromac Albion
Linfield	2–0	Crusaders
Newry Town	3–1	Ballymena United

=== Quarter-finals ===
Team 1	Score	Team 2
Bangor	3–2	Newry Town
Distillery	0–0 (a.e.t.) (1–3 p)	Larne
Glentoran	2–0	East Belfast
Linfield	1–0	Glenavon

=== Semi-finals ===
Team 1	Score	Team 2
Bangor	0–3	Linfield
Larne	2–5	Glentoran

=== Final ===
26 April 1990

Glentoran	0–0 (a.e.t.)	Linfield
Penalties
Macartney (penalty scored); Jameson (penalty scored); Bowers (penalty scored); Totten (penalty scored); Devine (penalty scored); McCaffrey (penalty scored)	6–5	(penalty scored) Burrows; (penalty scored) Magee; (penalty scored) Kerr; (penalty scored) Dunlop; (penalty scored) Knell; (penalty missed) Bailie

The Oval, Belfast
