= 1998–99 Gold Cup =

Tournament details
- Country: Northern Ireland
- Teams: 18

Final positions
- Champions: Glentoran (12th win)
- Runners-up: Portadown

Tournament statistics
- Matches played: 52
- Goals scored: 179 (3.44 per match)

The 1998–99 Gold Cup was the 80th edition of the Gold Cup, a cup competition in Northern Irish football.

The tournament was won by Glentoran for the 12th time, defeating Portadown 3–1 in the final at Windsor Park.

== Group standings ==
=== Section A ===
Pos	Team	Pld	W	D	L	GF	GA	GD	Pts	Result
1	Ballymena United	5	3	1	1	7	6	+1	10	Advance to quarter-final
2	Coleraine	5	2	3	0	9	5	+4	9	Advance to quarter-final
3	Cliftonville	5	2	2	1	8	6	+2	8	Advance to quarter-final
4	Distillery	5	1	4	0	10	6	+4	7	
5	Bangor	5	1	1	3	7	7	0	4	
6	Carrick Rangers	5	0	1	4	4	15	−11	1	

Source: Irish League Archive

=== Section B ===
Pos	Team	Pld	W	D	L	GF	GA	GD	Pts	Result
1	Linfield	5	4	0	1	11	4	+7	12	Advance to quarter-final
2	Glenavon	5	3	1	1	15	6	+9	10	Advance to quarter-final
3	Newry Town	5	3	1	1	15	10	+5	10	Advance to quarter-final
4	Limavady United	5	2	0	3	8	14	−6	6	
5	Dungannon Swifts	5	1	0	4	6	17	−11	3	
6	Crusaders	5	0	2	3	6	10	−4	2	

Source: Irish League Archive

=== Section C ===
Pos	Team	Pld	W	D	L	GF	GA	GD	Pts	Result
1	Glentoran	5	4	1	0	17	4	+13	13	Advance to quarter-final
2	Portadown	5	2	2	1	10	7	+3	8	Advance to quarter-final
3	Ards	5	2	1	2	6	10	−4	7	
4	Omagh Town	5	2	0	3	4	8	−4	6	
5	Larne	5	1	2	2	6	8	−2	5	
6	Ballyclare Comrades	5	1	0	4	5	11	−6	3	

Source: Irish League Archive

== Quarter-finals ==
Team 1	Score	Team 2
Cliftonville	2–3	Glenavon
Coleraine	1–2 (a.e.t.)	Linfield
Newry Town	1–3	Glentoran
Portadown	1–0	Ballymena United

== Semi-finals ==
Team 1	Score	Team 2
Glentoran	4–1	Glenavon
Portadown	3–0	Linfield

== Final ==
15 December 1998

Glentoran	3–1	Portadown
Hamill 11'; Kirk 63'; Devine 88'		Arkins 90'

Windsor Park, Belfast
