= Glenn Ferguson =

Northern Irish footballer and manager

Personal information
- Full name: Glenn William Ferguson
- Date of birth: 10 July 1969 (age 57)
- Place of birth: Belfast, Northern Ireland
- Position: Forward

Senior career*
Years	Team	Apps	(Gls)
1987–1990	Ards	52	(13)
1990–1998	Glenavon	204	(99)
1998–2009	Linfield	320	(175)
2009–2011	Lisburn Distillery	68	(24)
Total		644	(311)

International career
1991–2000	Irish League XI	4	(2)
1997–1998	Northern Ireland B	2	(0)
1999–2001	Northern Ireland	5	(0)

Managerial career
- 2011–2016: Ballymena United
- * Club domestic league appearances and goals

Glenn Ferguson (born 10 July 1969) is a Northern Irish former football player and manager.

Ferguson amassed over 1,000 appearances (nearly 1,050) in a career where he played for Ards, Glenavon, Linfield and Lisburn Distillery, and scored a total of 563 goals, placing him 2nd behind Jimmy Jones (648) on the list of all-time goalscorers in Northern Irish football. He was also capped 5 times by Northern Ireland. In his 24-year career, Ferguson won 31 winner's medals.

He also had a five-year managerial spell with Ballymena United, where he twice won the County Antrim Shield.

== Early life ==
Glenn was born on 10 July 1969 in the Ulster Hospital Dundonald to Thomas and Ida Ferguson and is the youngest of their three children.

== Records ==
Nicknamed "Spike", during his playing career, he played for Ards and Glenavon before joining Linfield in January 1998 for an Irish League record transfer fee of £55,000; this record was surpassed with Jamie McGonigle's move to Crusaders in August 2019 for £60,000.

He is Linfield's top scorer in European competition with 5 goals: Ferguson opening his European account with a consolation goal as Linfield were beaten 5–1 at the Makario Stadium in the 1998–99 UEFA Cup. The following week he netted again in the home leg. Ferguson netted twice against FC Haka in the 2000–01 UEFA Champions League and his fifth and final goal in European competition was against Stabæk Fotball in the 2002–03 UEFA Cup.

On 1 December 2006, he scored his 226th goal for Linfield, which took his career total to 476, making him the third highest scorer in the history of the local game, behind only Jimmy Jones and Joe Bambrick.

On 2 February 2008, during the CIS Cup Final, Ferguson came off the bench with 20 minutes remaining with Linfield trailing 2–1 to Crusaders. He scored twice in the last five minutes to turn around the match. Linfield won 3–2. These were his 500th and 501st goals in Irish Football, and his 250th and 251st for Linfield. On 9 February 2008 he became the all-time top goalscorer in the Irish Cup with two strikes against Bangor. Ferguson scored his 277th goal in his 500th game for Linfield in a 4–1 win over Coleraine on 13 December 2008.

Ferguson was released by Linfield in May 2009, having scored 285 goals in 515 appearances for the club. He signed for Lisburn Distillery, where he would finish his career.

On 28 August 2010, he played his 1,000th senior match in Northern Ireland – in Lisburn Distillery's 2–1 win over Newry City. Ferguson made his final career appearance on 30 April 2011, playing for Lisburn Distillery in their 4–3 home win over Cliftonville.

== International career ==
Having been previously capped for Northern Ireland B, Ferguson was first called into the Northern Ireland squad late in 1998. He made his debut against Canada on 7 April 1999 but did not play again until 2001. In all he won five caps, and represented the Irish League representative team four times, scoring twice.

== Managerial career ==
Ferguson was appointed manager of Ballymena United on 30 December 2011. His first game in charge was against Linfield F.C. on 8 January 2012, and won his first trophy as manager when the Sky Blues defeated Ferguson's former club Linfield in the County Antrim Shield final on 27 November 2012. Ferguson led Ballymena United to the Irish Cup final for the first time since winning the cup in 1989 where they were beaten 2–1 in the final by Glenavon. Ferguson was sacked in 2016.

== Managerial statistics ==
Team	Nation	From	To	Record							
Team	Nation	From	To	G	W	D	L	F	A	GD	Win %
Ballymena United	Northern Ireland	30 December 2011	6 March 2016	196	79	39	78	325	343	-18	40.31
Total				196	79	39	78	325	343	-18	40.31

As of 8 May 2023

== Honours ==
=== Player ===
Glenavon

- Irish Cup (1): 1996–97
- Gold Cup (2): 1990–91, 1997–98
- Floodlit Cup (1): 1996–97
- County Antrim Shield (2): 1990–91, 1995–96
- Mid-Ulster Cup (1): 1990–91
- IFA Charity Shield (1): 1992 (shared)

Linfield

- Irish League (6): 1999–00, 2000–01, 2003–04, 2005–06, 2006–07, 2007–08
- Irish Cup (4): 2001–02, 2005–06, 2006–07, 2007–08
- Irish League Cup (4): 1998–99, 1999–00, 2005–06, 2007–08
- County Antrim Shield (5): 1997–98, 2000–01, 2003–04, 2004–05, 2005–06
- IFA Charity Shield (1): 2000
- Setanta Cup (1): 2005

Lisburn Distillery

- Irish League Cup (1): 2010–11

=== Manager ===
Ballymena United

- County Antrim Shield (2): 2012–13, 2015–16

=== Individual ===
- Irish League top scorer (2) 1994-95 (27 goals), 2003–04 (25 goals)
- Ulster Footballer of the Year (3) 2000–01, 2003–04, 2005–06
- Northern Ireland Football Writers' Association Player of the Year (3) 2000–01, 2003–04, 2005–06
- Northern Ireland PFA Player of the Year (1) 1994

== See also ==
- List of men's footballers with the most official appearances
- List of men's footballers with 500 or more goals
