= Ulster Footballer of the Year =

Football Award

The Ulster Footballer of the Year is an association football player of the year award in Northern Ireland. One of two player of the year awards in Northern Ireland, the other is the Northern Ireland Football Writers' Association award. The Ulster award is the older of the two.

It is awarded by Castlereagh Glentoran Supporters' Club to the player who is adjudged by an independent committee to have been the best of the season in the Irish League. The award has been presented since the 1950–51 season, when the inaugural winner was Kevin McGarry of Cliftonville. The current holder of the award is Chris Shields, of Linfield. Glenn Ferguson has won the award most often: on three occasions.

== List of winners ==
Year	Player	Club
1950–51	(Northern Ireland) Kevin McGarry	Cliftonville
1951–52	(Scotland) Eric Treverrow	Ballymena United
1952–53	(Northern Ireland) Sammy Hughes	Glentoran
1953–54	(Scotland) Jimmy Delaney	Derry City
1954–55	(Northern Ireland) Maurice McVeigh	Glenavon
1955–56	(Northern Ireland) Dick Keith	Linfield
1956–57	(Northern Ireland) Wilbur Cush	Glenavon
1957–58	(England) Jackie Milburn	Linfield
1958–59	(Northern Ireland) Clancy McDermott	Coleraine
1959–60	(Northern Ireland) Billy Neill	Glentoran
1960–61	(Northern Ireland) Albert Campbell	Crusaders
1961–62	(Northern Ireland) Tommy Dickson	Linfield
1962–63	(Northern Ireland) Roy Rea	Glentoran
1963–64	(Northern Ireland) Trevor Thompson	Glentoran
1964–65	(Scotland) Dougie Wood	Derry City
1965–66	(Scotland) Tommy Leishman	Linfield
1966–67	(Northern Ireland) Walter Bruce	Glentoran
1967–68	(Northern Ireland) Sammy Hatton	Linfield
1968–69	(Northern Ireland) Billy McAvoy	Ards
1969–70	(Northern Ireland) Billy Humphries	Ards
1970–71	(Northern Ireland) Bryan Hamilton	Linfield
1971–72	(Northern Ireland) Billy Humphries	Ards
1972–73	(Northern Ireland) Sammy Lunn	Portadown
1973–74	(Northern Ireland) Arthur Stewart	Ballymena United
1974–75	(Northern Ireland) Eric Bowyer	Linfield
1975–76	(Northern Ireland) Warren Feeney	Glentoran
1976–77	(Northern Ireland) Peter Rafferty	Linfield
1977–78	(Northern Ireland) Jim Martin	Linfield
1978–79	(Northern Ireland) Roy Walsh	Glentoran
1979–80	(Northern Ireland) Lindsay McKeown	Linfield
1980–81	(Northern Ireland) George Dunlop	Linfield
1981–82	(Northern Ireland) Felix Healy	Coleraine
1982–83	(Northern Ireland) Jim Cleary	Glentoran
1983–84	(Northern Ireland) Bobby Carlisle	Cliftonville
1984–85	(Northern Ireland) Martin McGaughey	Linfield
1985–86	(Northern Ireland) Pat McCoy	Crusaders
1986–87	(Northern Ireland) Raymond McCoy	Coleraine
1987–88	(Northern Ireland) Alan Patterson	Glentoran
1988–89	(Northern Ireland) Lindsay McKeown	Linfield
1989–90	(Republic of Ireland) Ollie Ralph	Newry Town
1990–91	(Northern Ireland) Stephen McBride	Glenavon
1991–92	(Northern Ireland) Raymond Morrison	Glentoran
1992–93	(Scotland) Stevie Cowan	Portadown
1993–94	(Northern Ireland) Noel Bailie	Linfield
1994–95	(Scotland) Kevin McKeown	Crusaders
1995–96	(Northern Ireland) Peter Kennedy	Portadown
1996–97	(Northern Ireland) Stephen Baxter	Crusaders
1997–98	(Northern Ireland) Marty Tabb	Cliftonville
1998–99	(Northern Ireland) John Devine	Glentoran
1999–2000	(Republic of Ireland) Vinny Arkins	Portadown
2000–01	(Northern Ireland) Glenn Ferguson	Linfield
2001–02	(Northern Ireland) Mickey Keenan	Portadown
2002–03	(Northern Ireland) Gary Smyth	Glentoran
2003–04	(Northern Ireland) Glenn Ferguson	Linfield
2004–05	(Northern Ireland) Paul Leeman	Glentoran
2005–06	(Northern Ireland) Glenn Ferguson	Linfield
2006–07	(Northern Ireland) William Murphy	Linfield
2007–08	(Northern Ireland) Alan Mannus	Linfield
2008–09	(Northern Ireland) Chris Scannell	Cliftonville
2009–10	(Northern Ireland) Rory Patterson	Coleraine
2010–11	(Northern Ireland) Alan Blayney	Linfield
2011–12	(Scotland) Gary McCutcheon	Ballymena United
2012–13	(Northern Ireland) Liam Boyce	Cliftonville
2013–14	(Northern Ireland) Joe Gormley	Cliftonville
2014–15	(Northern Ireland) Paul Heatley	Crusaders
2015–16	(Northern Ireland) Billy Joe Burns	Crusaders
2016–17	(Northern Ireland) Jamie Mulgrew	Linfield
2017–18	(Northern Ireland) Gavin Whyte	Crusaders
2018–19	(Northern Ireland) Jimmy Callacher	Linfield
2019–20	No award due to COVID-19 pandemic in Northern Ireland	
2020–21	(Northern Ireland) Shayne Lavery	Linfield
2021–22	(Republic of Ireland) Chris Shields	Linfield
2022–23	(Northern Ireland) Leroy Millar	Larne
2023–24	(Northern Ireland) Kyle McClean	Linfield
2024–25	(Northern Ireland) Joel Cooper	Linfield
2025–26	(Scotland) Rohan Ferguson	Larne

=== Wins by player (multiple) ===
Player	Total	Years
(Northern Ireland) Glenn Ferguson	3	2001, 2004, 2006
(Northern Ireland) Billy Humphries	2	1970, 1972
(Northern Ireland) Lindsay McKeown	2	1980, 1990

=== Wins by country ===
Club	Players	Total
Northern Ireland	58	62
Scotland	8	8
Republic of Ireland	3	3
England	1	1

=== Wins by club ===
Club	Players	Total
Linfield	23	26
Glentoran	13	13
Crusaders	7	7
Cliftonville	6	6
Portadown	5	5
Coleraine	4	4
Ards	2	3
Ballymena United	3	3
Glenavon	3	3
Derry City	2	2
Larne	1	1
Newry City	1	1

== See also ==
- Northern Ireland Football Writers' Association Player of the Year
