= St Michael's Grammar School, Lurgan =

St Michael's Grammar School
- Scoil Ghramadaí Naomh Mícheál

Location
- Lurgan, County Armagh; Northern Ireland; 54.477°N 6.321°W

Information
- Type: Grammar school
- Motto: Ad Jesum Per Mariam
- Religious affiliation: Roman Catholic
- Established: 1924
- Closed: 2015
- Principal: G. Adams
- Colours: Navy blue and yellow
- Website: www.stmichaelslurgan.org.uk (inactive)

St Michael's Grammar School (Irish: Scoil Ghramadaí Naomh Mícheál, an Lorgain) was a Roman Catholic grammar school in Lurgan, County Armagh, Northern Ireland.

== History ==
The property known as "Irishtown Hill House", Cornakinnegar, was purchased in 1892 for the permanent Boys' Industrial School. Plans for an extension having been approved, Dr. O'Neill laid the foundation stone and the school was named St. Michael's as a form of tribute to Rev. Michael B. McConville, PP. The boys were transferred from their temporary school for Junior Industrial Boys (established in 1905) at 81, William Street, Lurgan, on 26 June 1903 and remained there until 1924 when the two Industrial Schools - St. Michael's for Boys and the House of Divine Providence for Girls (established from 1892) - closed as a result of the partition of Ireland.

With continued refashioned and extension the Boys' Industrial School developed rapidly into Our Lady's Boarding School. As enrollment increased four new classrooms were added in 1950 and in 1959 a new chapel was completed at the expense of the Mercy Order and blessed by Bishop Eugene O'Doherty.

From 1965 to 1972 a programme of expansion was carried out which included the addition of a canteen, 6th Form Centre, sports hall, music and lecture rooms, art room, science laboratories, assembly hall and general subjects classrooms.

In 1972 the name of the school was officially changed from Our Lady's to St. Michael's Senior High School when it became a co-educational school enrolling pupils at 14+ following the introduction of the Two-Tier system in the Craigavon Area (the Dickson Plan).

Along with Lurgan College and Portadown College, St Michael's forms the grammar stream of the Dickson Plan in this area. Access to the schools was selective, based on academic merit.

In the 1990s the school was further extended with the erection of a Technology Suite.

St Michael's Grammar School closed in June 2015 and the building is now being used as part of St Ronans College.

== Subject choice ==
St Michael's offers a diverse range of subjects including art, biology, business study, chemistry, English/drama, geography, history, home economics, politics, IT, languages (French, Spanish and Irish), mathematics, religion, technology and design, music, accounting, sociology, drama, P.E. and physics.

== Notable alumni ==
- Breandán Mac Cionnaith (born 1958) - Irish republican activist
- Dolores Kelly (born 1959) - SDLP politician; Member of the Northern Ireland Assembly (MLA) for Upper Bann
- John Daly (born 1960) - chat show host
- Neil Lennon (born 1971) - former Northern Ireland and Glasgow Celtic footballer
- Julie O'Connor - Northern Irish television presenter and journalist; currently a reporter for UTV Live
- Marc Wilson (born 1987) - Irish footballer
- Shayne Lavery (born 1998) - footballer
- Its_Wendie_ (born 1974) - local social media personality
