= Champions Cup (All-Ireland) =

All-island association football competition

- Organiser(s): Irish Football Association; Football Association of Ireland
- Founded: 2019
- Abolished: 2020 (postponed due to COVID-19 pandemic and not reestablished)
- Region: Northern Ireland; Republic of Ireland
- Teams: 2
- Last champions: Dundalk
- Most championships: Dundalk (1 title)

The Champions Cup (known as the Unite the Union Champions Cup for sponsorship purposes) was a cross-border association football super cup, run for a single edition in 2019, that featured the league champions from both football associations on the island of Ireland. The competition saw the League of Ireland Premier Division champions from the Republic of Ireland face the NIFL Premiership champions from Northern Ireland. The Champions Cup was the successor to the Setanta Sports Cup, the previous all-Ireland competition which ran from 2005 until 2014. The Champions Cup was sponsored by Unite the Union, the British and Irish trade union. The 2019 edition was the only one contested and, as of 2022, there was reportedly little prospect of the competition returning.

== History ==
The Champions Cup was the seventh major all-Ireland competition since Irish football was split into two jurisdictions following the partition of Ireland in 1921. Previous competitions included the Dublin and Belfast Intercity Cup (1941–1949), the North-South Cup (1961–1963), the Blaxnit Cup (1967–1974), the Texaco Cup (1973–1975), the Tyler Cup (1978–1980), and the Setanta Sports Cup (2005–2014). There was also the Irish News Cup (1995–1999), however this is not counted among the major all-Ireland competitions, as neither the league champions or the cup winners were invited.

The final edition of the previous all-Ireland competition, the Setanta Sports Cup, took place in 2014. Linfield and Cliftonville declined the invitation to take part, citing inconvenient fixture scheduling and reduced prize money as their reasons for deciding not to enter. As a result, Ballinamallard United and Coleraine were invited to take part instead, and the tournament did eventually take place – for what turned out to be the final time. The withdrawal of two high-profile Northern Ireland Football League clubs was a major blow for the competition, and raised doubts regarding its future. The 2015 tournament was initially scheduled to take place as planned, with four clubs from each league. However, in May 2015, NIFL clubs again voiced concerns over fixture scheduling – particularly plans for midweek games. When suitable fixture dates could not be agreed upon by the clubs, the competition was ultimately postponed until 2016. However, the 2016 tournament did not materialise. In December 2015, principal sponsor Setanta Sports was acquired by Eir and became Eir Sport in 2016, with the competition eventually being scrapped.

In February 2019, the FAI announced that a 'champions match' would take place between the League of Ireland champions and the Northern Ireland Football League champions. However, the Northern Ireland Football League said they were surprised at the announcement, adding that discussions were still ongoing. In May 2019, after five years without an all-Ireland competition, it was confirmed that a new competition would take place between the champions of the Northern Ireland Football League and the League of Ireland. The inaugural competition was a two-legged tie played in November 2019, with each team playing home and away. The winners received €50,000, while the runners-up received €25,000. A further €25,000 was allocated to community-based projects in the local areas of the two competing clubs.

The 2020 edition was postponed in November 2020 due to the COVID-19 pandemic, while plans for an expanded 4-team tournament were announced for 2021. A draw for the venue to host the final of the 2021 edition was held in October 2021, with the Aviva Stadium in Dublin drawn over Belfast's Windsor Park, while Linfield would face Coleraine in one Semi-final following 1st and 2nd placed finishes respectively in the 2020–21 NIFL Premiership, with the other Semi-final likely to be an all Dublin affair of Shamrock Rovers vs St Patrick's Athletic as 1st and 2nd in the 2021 League of Ireland Premier Division. In November 2021, it was announced that the tournament had been postponed again, with a statement citing "in light of the current Covid-19 situation on both sides of the border, Unite The Union has asked the FAI and the IFA to postpone the competition until 2022. Both associations have agreed to the request". On 4 May 2022, it was announced that the 2021 edition of the competition had been called off, with scheduling issues cited as the reason for the decision.

The next time the champions of the two leagues played in a competitive match was in the 2024–25 UEFA Conference League, where Shamrock Rovers defeated Larne F.C. away 4–1.

In summer 2025 the champions found themselves in competitive matches again, four times in a few weeks: Shelbourne defeated Linfield both in the 2025–26 UEFA Champions League first qualifying round, 2–1 on aggregate in July, and then 5–1 on aggregate in the 2025–26 UEFA Conference League play-off round, in August.

== Editions ==
=== 2019 ===
In the inaugural competition, the 2018–19 NIFL Premiership champions, Linfield, faced the 2019 League of Ireland Premier Division champions, Dundalk, with the matches played on 8 and 11 November 2019. Dundalk won 7-1 on aggregate to become the first holders.

8 November 2019
19:45 GMT
First leg

Linfield (Northern Ireland)	1–1	(Republic of Ireland) Dundalk
Lavery 8'	BBC Sport; SSE	D. Kelly 51'

Windsor Park, Belfast
Attendance: 2,819
Referee: Ian McNabb

11 November 2019
19:05 GMT
Second leg

Dundalk (Republic of Ireland)	6–0	(Northern Ireland) Linfield
G. Kelly 11', 69'; Gartland 16'; McGrath 39'; Benson 60'; Hoban 79'	Report

Oriel Park, Dundalk
Attendance: 2,412
Referee: Stéphanie Frappart

== See also ==
- Setanta Sports Cup
- Dublin and Belfast Intercity Cup
- North-South Cup
- Blaxnit Cup
- Texaco Cup
- Tyler Cup
- Irish News Cup
