= Michael Keenan =

Michael Keenan may refer to:

- Michael Keenan (politician) (born 1972), member of the Australian House of Representatives 2004–2019
- Michael Keenan (actor) (1939–2020), American actor and academic
- Mike Keenan, Canadian hockey coach
- Mickey Keenan, Northern Irish football goalkeeper
