= Eric Treverrow =

Scottish footballer (1926–2015)

Personal information
- Date of birth: 1926
- Place of birth: Glasgow, Scotland
- Date of death: 2 October 2015 (aged 88–89)
- Place of death: Newtownards, Northern Ireland
- Position: Right-back

Senior career*
Years	Team	Apps	(Gls)
1945–1955	Parkhead Juniors	234	(23)
- Ballymena United
- * Club domestic league appearances and goals

Eric Penrose Treverrow (1926 – 2 October 2015) was a Scottish footballer who played as a right-back in the Irish League with Ballymena United. He won ten inter-league caps for the Irish League.

Born in Renfrewshire in 1926, he was playing for Scottish junior club Parkhead when recruited by Ballymena in 1948. He went on to make a record 559 appearances for the club and was a member of the team that won the Irish Cup in 1958. He appeared ten times for the Irish League representative team between 1950 and 1953 and was Ulster Footballer of the Year in 1952. He died in Newtownards, County Down on 2 October 2015.
