= Jamie Mulgrew =

Northern Irish footballer

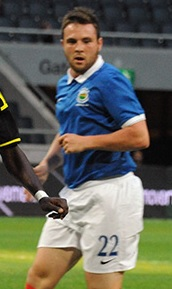

Personal information
- Full name: James Mulgrew
- Date of birth: 5 June 1986 (age 40)
- Place of birth: Belfast, Northern Ireland
- Position: Midfielder

Team information
- Current team: Linfield
- Number: 22

Senior career*
Years	Team	Apps	(Gls)
2004–2005	Glentoran	1	(0)
2005–	Linfield	758	(48)

International career^{‡}
2007	Northern Ireland U21	1	(0)
2010	Northern Ireland	2	(0)
- * Club domestic league appearances and goals as of 20:25, 5 September 2022 ‡ National team caps and goals as of 30 May 2010

Jamie Mulgrew (born 5 June 1986) is a Northern Irish professional footballer who plays for Linfield of the NIFL Premiership and who has been capped by the Northern Ireland national team.

== Club career ==
Mulgrew began his career with Glentoran, making two senior appearances during the 2004–05 season. In 2005, he moved to Glentoran's rivals Linfield and quickly became a fixture with the first team squad. He was named as Linfield's Player of the Season for 2010 and as of the end of the 2019–20 season had appeared 589 times for the club in all competitions, having scored 45 goals.

It was reported by the Belfast Telegraph on 8 February 2011 that Scottish Premier League clubs Kilmarnock and Hibernian, along with Major League Soccer club Portland Timbers, were interested in signing Mulgrew on a Bosman free transfer when his contract expires in the summer.

In 2011, Mulgrew had trials with Major League Soccer sides Columbus Crew and Portland Timbers.

He was named Ulster Footballer of the Year and Northern Ireland Football Writers' Association Player of the Year for the 2016–17 season.

== International career ==
He has been capped at the under-21 level for his country, playing against Moldova in a UEFA Under-21 European Championship qualifying match.

He made his full debut for Northern Ireland on 26 May 2010 against Turkey in a friendly.

== Honours ==
=== Club ===
Linfield

- IFA Premiership/NIFL Premiership: 2006–07, 2007–08, 2009–10, 2010–11, 2011–12, 2016–17, 2018–19, 2019–20, 2020–21, 2021–22, 2024–25
- Irish Cup: 2006–07, 2007–08, 2009–10, 2010–11, 2011–12, 2016–17, 2020–21
- Irish League Cup: 2007–08, 2018–19, 2022-23, 2023–24, 2025–26
- County Antrim Shield: 2005–06, 2013–14, 2016–17
- NIFL Charity Shield: 2017

=== Individual ===
- Linfield Player of the Year: 2009–10
- Northern Ireland Football Writers' Association Player of the Year: 2016–17
- Ulster Footballer of the Year: 2016–17
