= Kevin McKeown (footballer) =

Scottish footballer

Personal information
- Date of birth: 12 October 1967 (age 59)
- Place of birth: Glasgow, Scotland
- Height: 1.85 m (6 ft 1 in)
- Position: Goalkeeper

Senior career*
Years	Team	Apps	(Gls)
1985–1990	Motherwell	3	(0)
1986–1987	→ Stenhousemuir (loan)	17	(0)
1988	→ Stirling Albion (loan)	1	(0)
1989	→ Crusaders (loan)	6	(0)
1989–1990	→ Stenhousemuir (loan)	11	(0)
1990–1997	Crusaders	193	(0)
1997–1998	Ayr United	2	(0)
1998–1999	Newry Town	17	(0)
1999–2001	Coleraine	49	(0)
2001	Cliftonville	4	(0)
2001–2003	Brechin City	10	(0)
2003	Linlithgow Rose	0	(0)
2003–2004	East Fife	0	(0)
2004–2005	Stenhousemuir	0	(0)
Total		339	(0)

International career
1991–1995	Irish League XI	2	(0)
- * Club domestic league appearances and goals

Kevin McKeown (born 12 October 1967) is a Scottish retired footballer, who played as a goalkeeper. He played for Motherwell, Stenhousemuir, and Stirling in Scotland before moving to the Irish League with Crusaders. In 1994–95 he was named as the Ulster Footballer of the Year. McKeown subsequently played for Ayr United, Newry Town, Coleraine, Cliftonville, Brechin City, and East Fife.

== Honours ==
Crusaders

- Irish League (2): 1994–95, 1996–97
- Irish League Cup (1): 1996–97
- County Antrim Shield (1): 1991/92
- Ulster Cup (1): 1993/94

Individual

- Ulster Footballer of the Year (1): 1994–95
- NI Football Writers' Association Player of the Year (1): 1994–95
- NI PFA Player of the Year (1): 1994–95
