= Peter Rafferty =

Northern Ireland association footballer

Personal information
- Date of birth: 7 November 1948 (age 77)
- Place of birth: Belfast, Northern Ireland
- Position: Centre back

Senior career*
Years	Team	Apps	(Gls)
1967–1973	Distillery	262	(36)
1973–1982	Linfield	331	(42)
1982–1983	Ards		(7)
1983–1985	Crusaders		(2)

International career
1979	Northern Ireland	1	(0)
- * Club domestic league appearances and goals

Peter Rafferty (born 7 November 1948) is a Northern Irish retired footballer who played in the Irish League with Distillery, Linfield, Ards and Crusaders in the 1960s, 1970s and 1980s. He won 1 international cap for Northern Ireland. He also won two caps for the Irish League representative team.

He made his Irish League debut in April 1967 for Distillery as a centre-forward, but established himself the following season as a centre-half. He won an Irish Cup winners' medal with the Whites in 1971. In total he made 262 appearances for Distillery, turning out in every position including goalkeeper, before he was signed by Linfield in December 1973.

Nicknamed the "Bald Eagle" by the Linfield supporters, he made 331 appearances in nine seasons for the Blues, winning five Irish League titles, three Irish Cups, one City Cup, two Gold Cups, four Ulster Cups, three County Antrim Shields and 1 Tyler Cup. He was the Ulster Footballer of the Year for 1976–77.

He finished his career with a season at Ards and two at Crusaders.

== Sources ==
- M. Brodie (ed.), Northern Ireland Soccer Yearbook 2009-2010, p. 102. Belfast:Ulster Tatler Publications
- Northern Ireland's Footballing Greats
