= Billy Humphries =

Northern Irish footballer (born 1936)

Personal information
- Full name: William McCauley Humphries
- Date of birth: 8 June 1936 (age 90)
- Place of birth: Belfast, Northern Ireland
- Position: Winger

Senior career*
Years	Team	Apps	(Gls)
?–1951	East Belfast		
1951–1955	Glentoran		
1955–1958	Ards		
1958–1959	Leeds United	25	(2)
1959–1962	Ards		
1962–1964/5	Coventry City	109	(24)
1964/5–1968	Swansea Town	141	(22)
1968–76	Ards		

International career
1956–1957	Northern Ireland Amateur	3	(0)
1962–1965	Northern Ireland	14	(1)
1957–1974	Irish League XI	13	(0)
1975–1977	Irish XI (unofficial)	2	(0)

Managerial career
- 1970–1978: Ards
- 1980–1982: Ards
- 1983–1985: Bangor
- * Club domestic league appearances and goals

William McCauley Humphries (born 8 June 1936), known as Billy Humphries, is a Northern Irish former footballer who played as a winger. He played in the Irish League with Glentoran and Ards, and in England with Leeds United, Coventry City and Swansea Town in the 1950s, 1960s and 1970s. He won 14 international caps for Northern Ireland. He also won three caps for Northern Ireland amateur team and thirteen caps for the Irish League representative team.

Including selection and reserve teams, he has made over 1,000 appearances in his career.

== Career ==
Humphries was a member of Ards' first and only League championship team in 1957–58. He signed for Leeds United in September 1958, but, not having settled, he returned home to Ards in November 1959. During his second spell at Ards he won his first international cap in April 1962 against Wales. The international appearance brought Humphries to the attention of Jimmy Hill, the Coventry City manager, who paid Ards a £14,000 transfer fee a week after the match in Wales. Humphries ended up with fourteen international caps. Humphries won the Third Division title with Coventry in 1963–64, scoring ten goals. During the following season he moved to Second Division Swansea Town, but ended up relegated at the end of the season, and relegated again to the Fourth Division in 1967.

He was released by Swansea in June 1968, and returned to Northern Ireland for his third spell at Ards. He won the Irish Cup in 1969 and was named as Ulster Footballer of the Year for 1969-70 and again for 1971–72. He was also the Northern Ireland Football Writers' Player of the Year for 1971–72. Player-manager from 1970, he was a member of Ards' four-trophy-winning team in 1973–74, winning Irish Cup, Ulster Cup, Gold Cup and Blaxnit Cup medals. He retired as a player in 1976, aged 39, but served as Ards manager until 1978, and again from 1980 to 1982. He then managed Bangor from 1983 to 1985.

== Honours ==
- Irish League: 1957–58
- Football League Third Division: 1963–64
- Welsh Cup: 1965–66
- Irish Cup: 1968–69, 1973–74
- County Antrim Shield: 1971–72
- Ulster Cup: 1973–74
- Gold Cup: 1973–74

Individual

- Ulster Footballer of the Year: 1969–70, 1971–72
- Northern Ireland Football Writers' Association Player of the Year: 1971–72.

== Sources ==
- M. Brodie (ed.), Northern Ireland Soccer Yearbook 2009-2010, p. 102. Belfast:Ulster Tatler Publications
- Northern Ireland's Footballing Greats
- Billy Humphries at National-Football-Teams.com
