= Lindsay McKeown =

Northern Irish footballer

Personal information
- Date of birth: 11 July 1957 (age 69)
- Place of birth: Belfast, Northern Ireland
- Positions: Sweeper; midfielder

Senior career*
Years	Team	Apps	(Gls)
1973–1976	Manchester United	0	(0)
1976–1978	Sheffield Wednesday	6	(0)
1979–1991	Linfield	?	(?)
- * Club domestic league appearances and goals

Lindsay McKeown was a Northern Irish footballer who played in the Irish League for twelve seasons with Linfield throughout the 1980s. He won youth caps for Northern Ireland and four caps for the Irish League representative team.

He was a member of the Linfield team that won six League titles in a row from 1981-82 until 1986-87. In total he won eight Irish League championships, two Irish Cups, four Gold Cups, one Ulster Cup, one Irish League Cup, three County Antrim Shields and one Tyler All-Ireland Cup. He was the Ulster Footballer of the Year twice (in 1979–80 and 1989–90) and Northern Ireland Football Writers' Association Player of the Year in 1979-80.
