= Bryan Hamilton =

Northern Irish footballer and manager

Personal information
- Date of birth: 31 December 1946 (age 79)
- Place of birth: Belfast, Northern Ireland
- Position: Midfielder

Senior career*
Years	Team	Apps	(Gls)
1964–1966	Distillery		
1966–1971	Linfield		
1971–1976	Ipswich Town	153	(43)
1976–1977	Everton	41	(5)
1977–1978	Millwall	49	(6)
1978–1980	Swindon Town	24	(1)
1980–1985	Tranmere Rovers	109	(6)
Total		376	(61)

International career
1968–1980	Northern Ireland	50	(4)

Managerial career
- 1980–1985: Tranmere Rovers
- 1985–1986: Wigan Athletic
- 1986–1987: Leicester City
- 1989–1993: Wigan Athletic
- 1994–1998: Northern Ireland
- 2000: Norwich City
- * Club domestic league appearances and goals

Bryan Hamilton (born 31 December 1946) is a Northern Irish former professional football player and manager. He gained 50 caps for Northern Ireland between 1969 and 1980, and later managed the national team for four years. He later became Technical Director at Antigua Barracuda F.C.

== Biography ==
=== Playing career ===
Born in Belfast, Hamilton began his career at Distillery, before moving on to Linfield. He was named Ulster Footballer of the Year and Northern Ireland Football Writers' Association Player of the Year for the 1970/71 season, also finishing as Irish League top goalscorer. In 1971, he signed for Ipswich Town, where he spent five years and made over 150 appearances for the club. In 1976, he signed for Everton, before moving onto short spells at Millwall and Swindon Town.

In the FA Cup semi-final of 1977 between Everton and local rivals Liverpool at Maine Road, with the score at 2–2 late in the game, Hamilton scored. However, his goal was disallowed by referee Clive Thomas and the match went to a replay, which Everton lost 3–0. This echoed an incident in the 1975 FA Cup semi-final replay, when Thomas had similarly disallowed a potentially match-winning goal by Hamilton.

== Managerial career ==
Hamilton became player/manager of Tranmere Rovers in 1980. The club remained in the Fourth Division throughout this period, with three top half finishes during his five-year period in charge, culminating in a finish of 6th in 1984–85.

He was appointed manager of Wigan Athletic in March 1985. Shortly after joining he led them to victory in the 1985 Associate Members' Cup Final. The 1985–86 season saw Wigan emerge as contenders for promotion to the Second Division, a feat which looked likely for virtually the entire campaign. However, when Wigan had completed their fixtures Derby County had three games in hand, two of which would be won to pip the Latics by a single point. His achievements with Wigan did not go unnoticed, and he moved to Leicester City soon afterwards. However, he was unable to keep Leicester in the First Division and soon left the club, and returned to Wigan as manager from 1989 to 1993.

Hamilton was appointed manager of Northern Ireland in 1994, succeeding Billy Bingham. In the Euro 96 qualifiers, Northern Ireland were in contention for qualification and were only narrowly pipped to second place by the Republic of Ireland. The 1998 World Cup qualifiers provided a far worse return despite a promising early draw with Germany – who would later beat Northern Ireland for the first time in two decades – and Hamilton left the job at the end of the qualifiers.

In April 2000 he was appointed manager of Norwich City, but resigned on 4 December. He returned to Ipswich as coach in 2001, but left the club in 2002. In November 2006, he was appointed Technical Director of the Antigua and Barbuda Football Association.

Hamilton is now a media pundit working mainly with Eurosport, BBC Radio 5 Live, Setanta Sports, Today FM, Sky Sports and Anglia Television.

== Honours ==
=== As a player ===
Everton

- Football League Cup runner-up: 1976–77

Individual

- Ulster Footballer of the Year: 1970–71
- Northern Ireland Football Writers' Association Player of the Year: 1970–71
- Ipswich Town Hall of Fame: Inducted 2014

=== As a manager ===
Wigan Athletic

- Associate Members' Cup: 1984–85
