= 2020–21 Irish Cup =

2020–21 Irish football Cup

Tournament details
- Country: Northern Ireland
- Dates: 27 Apr – 21 May 2021
- Teams: 26

Final positions
- Champions: Linfield (44th title)
- Runners-up: Larne

Tournament statistics
- Matches played: 25
- Goals scored: 87 (3.48 per match)

The 2020–21 Irish Cup (known as the Sadler's Peaky Blinder Irish Cup for sponsorship purposes) was the 141st edition of the Irish Cup, the premier knockout cup competition in Northern Irish football since its inauguration in 1881. The competition began on 27 April 2021 and concluded with the final at Mourneview Park, Lurgan on 21 May 2021.

Glentoran were the defending champions, after they defeated Ballymena United 2–1 after extra time in the previous season's delayed final played in July 2020. This took their tally to 23 Irish Cup wins overall; their first for five years. This season they were beaten by Crusaders in the quarter-finals.

Linfield were this season's winners, defeating Larne 2–1 in the first ever meeting between the two teams in the final. This extended Linfield's record of Irish Cup wins to 44; their first win since 2017. It also meant a sixth Irish Cup final appearance for Larne without ever winning the competition, extending that unwanted record.

Since Linfield had already qualified for Europe via their league position, the berth for the 2021–22 UEFA Europa Conference League first qualifying round was redistributed to the 3rd-placed 2020–21 NIFL Premiership team.

== Format and schedule ==
As a result of the COVID-19 pandemic in Northern Ireland, this season's competition was played in a condensed format spanning just 24 days. Due to the pandemic lockdown restrictions, all matches were played behind closed doors except the final, where a limited attendance of 1,000 was permitted. The competition was significantly reduced in size with only 32 clubs initially invited to take part. This included the 24 clubs across the NIFL Premiership and NIFL Championship, the four semi-finalists from the 2019–20 Irish Intermediate Cup, and the next four highest-ranked teams from the previous season's league system. Extra time was also scrapped from this season's competition, with the winner of all matches level after 90 minutes being decided by a penalty shoot-out. The competition was initially scheduled to begin in January 2021, however, it was postponed due to the fact that no clubs from outside the NIFL Premiership had the 'elite' sporting status required to allow them to play matches during the COVID-19 pandemic lockdown.

The competition was given the go ahead to start in April 2021 with only 26 entrants, after six NIFL Championship clubs, namely: Ards, Dundela, Harland & Wolff Welders, Institute, Newry City AFC and Queen's University subsequently withdrew from the competition, having not played a competitive fixture since March 2020. The six clubs originally drawn to play them in the first round were therefore given a bye into the second round.

Round	First match date	Fixtures	Clubs
First round	27 April 2021	10	26 → 16
Second round	8 May 2021	8	16 → 8
Quarter-finals	11 May 2021	4	8 → 4
Semi-finals	18 May 2021	2	4 → 2
Final	21 May 2021	1	2 → 1

== Results ==
The league tier of each club at the time of entering the competition is listed in parentheses.

- (1) = NIFL Premiership
- (2) = NIFL Championship
- (3) = NIFL Premier Intermediate League
- (NL) = Non-league (clubs outside the Northern Ireland Football League – levels 4–7)

=== First round ===
The draw for the first round took place on 17 December 2020, with the matches played on 27 April and 1 May 2021. All clubs entered in the first round, with the 32 teams drawn randomly into 16 ties. Six NIFL Championship clubs (Ards, Dundela, Harland & Wolff Welders, Institute, Newry City AFC and Queen's University) later withdrew from the competition, with their opponents given a bye into the second round.

Team 1	Score	Team 2
Ards (2) (withdrew)	bye	Dollingstown (3)
Glentoran (1)	bye	Dundela (2) (withdrew)
Harland & Wolff Welders (2) (withdrew)	bye	St James' Swifts (NL)
Institute (2) (withdrew)	bye	PSNI (3)
Larne (1)	bye	Newry City AFC (2) (withdrew)
Queen's University (2) (withdrew)	bye	Bangor (3)
27 April 2021
Ballymena United (1)	4–1	Portadown (1)
Carrick Rangers (1)	3–0	Belfast Celtic (NL)
Cliftonville (1)	5–1	Portstewart (3)
Coleraine (1)	0–1	Crusaders (1)
Glenavon (1)	1–2	Dungannon Swifts (1)
Linfield (1)	2–0	Annagh United (2)
Warrenpoint Town (1)	2–1	Ballyclare Comrades (2)
1 May 2021
Ballinamallard United (2)	2–2 (8–9 p)	Dergview (2)
Knockbreda (2)	2–1	Newington (3)
Loughgall (2)	1–1 (3–2 p)	Banbridge Town (3)

=== Second round ===
16 clubs entered the second round – the 10 first round winners along with the 6 clubs that received byes. The second round draw was made on 1 May 2021, with the matches played on 8 May 2021.

Team 1	Score	Team 2
Ballymena United (1)	5–0	PSNI (3)
Carrick Rangers (1)	2–2 (3–1 p)	Bangor (3)
Dergview (2)	2–0	St James' Swifts (NL)
Glentoran (1)	1–0	Cliftonville (1)
Knockbreda (2)	0–5	Crusaders (1)
Larne (1)	8–1	Dollingstown (3)
Linfield (1)	5–2	Dungannon Swifts (1)
Loughgall (2)	1–0	Warrenpoint Town (1)

=== Quarter-finals ===
The eight second round winners entered the quarter-finals. The quarter-final draw was made on 8 May, with the matches played on 11 May 2021.

11 May 2021	Ballymena United (1)	5–0	Dergview (2)	Ballymena Showgrounds, Ballymena
19:45 BST	McCartan 15'; Waide 18'; Hume 20'; McElroy 58', 68'	BBC Sport		Attendance: 0 (Note: Match was played behind closed doors due to the COVID-19 pandemic in Northern Ireland)

11 May 2021	Glentoran (1)	0–1	Crusaders (1)	The Oval, Belfast
19:45 BST		BBC Sport	Burns 9'	Attendance: 0

11 May 2021	Larne (1)	2–1	Carrick Rangers (1)	Inver Park, Larne
19:45 BST	Forsythe 23' (o.g.); Hale 30'	BBC Sport	Gibson 58'	Attendance: 0

11 May 2021	Loughgall (2)	1–3	Linfield (1)	Lakeview Park, Loughgall
19:45 BST	Rea 63'	BBC Sport	Lavery 41', 49', 90'	Attendance: 0

=== Semi-finals ===
The four quarter-final winners entered the semi-finals. The draw was made on 11 May 2021, with the matches played on 18 May 2021 at Mourneview Park, Lurgan.

18 May 2021	Larne (1)	1–1 (6–5 p)	Crusaders (1)	Mourneview Park, Lurgan
16:00 BST	Hale 58'	BBC Sport	Lowry 27'	Attendance: 0

18 May 2021	Ballymena United (1)	0–3	Linfield (1)	Mourneview Park, Lurgan
20:00 BST		BBC Sport	Fallon 19'; Lavery 49', 62'	Attendance: 0

=== Final ===
The final was played on 21 May 2021 at Mourneview Park, Lurgan for the first time; the 13th different venue to host an Irish Cup final. This was the first Irish Cup final since 1975 to be staged outside Belfast, and only the second final since 1995 (the other final being 2015) that was not played at Windsor Park. This was as a result of maintenance work being carried out at the stadium, including a new playing surface being laid, in preparation for hosting the 2021 UEFA Super Cup in August.

Larne and Linfield met in the Irish Cup final for the first time. Larne appeared in the final for the sixth time, having finished as runners-up in each of their previous five appearances in the final. This was their first final since 2005 when they were defeated 5–1 by Portadown. Linfield reached the final for the 64th time; the first time since 2017 when they defeated Coleraine 3–0 to win the cup for the 43rd time and secure a league, Irish Cup, and County Antrim Shield treble.

Linfield defeated Larne 2–1 to win a record 44th Irish Cup, thanks to first-half goals from Shayne Lavery and Joel Cooper. Larne lost in the final for the sixth time, extending their unwanted record of having appeared in the most Irish Cup finals of any club yet to win the competition.

21 May 2021
19:45 BST

Larne (1)	1–2	Linfield (1)
Hughes 90+2'	BBC Sport	Lavery 5'; Cooper 32'

Mourneview Park, Lurgan
Attendance: 1,000 (Note: Attendance was limited to 1,000 due to the COVID-19 pandemic in Northern Ireland)
Referee: Andrew Davey
