= Sammy Hatton =

Northern Irish association football player

Personal information
- Date of birth: 1935
- Place of birth: Northern Ireland
- Date of death: 20 March 1995 (aged 59)
- Position: Centre-half

Youth career
- 55th Old Boys

Senior career*
Years	Team	Apps	(Gls)
- Bangor
1960–1961	Ards		
1961–1970	Linfield		

International career
1962	Northern Ireland	2	(0)

Managerial career
- 1972–1973: Linfield
- * Club domestic league appearances and goals

Sammy Hatton (1935 — 20 March 1995) was a Northern Irish footballer who played in the Irish League as a centre-half with Linfield in the 1960s. He won two international caps for Northern Ireland. He also played for the Northern Ireland amateur team and earned one cap for the Irish League representative side.

He made his name with Ards, for whom he was the club's player of the year in 1960/61, after which he was signed by Linfield. In his first season at Windsor Park, he was part of Linfield's seven-trophy-winning team, playing 52 games and winning the League title, the Irish Cup, City Cup, Ulster Cup, Gold Cup, County Antrim Shield and North-South Cup. The following season, he won two international caps, being called into the Northern Ireland team to replace Terry Neill for 2-0 European Nations Cup victory against Poland in Katowice, and again for the Home International match that year against Scotland. That season also saw a second Irish Cup winner's medal; a competition which he won for a third time in his last season, 1969/70. He also won two further Irish League championships: in 1965/66 and 1968/69.

In 1967/68 he was named Ulster Footballer of the Year.

In 1970, he was released by Linfield, but stayed on as a youth coach. From 1972 to 1973 he coached the first team.
