= Roy Rea =

Northern Irish association footballer

Personal information
- Full name: Robert Rea
- Date of birth: 28 November 1934
- Place of birth: Belfast, Northern Ireland
- Date of death: 5 April 2005 (aged 70)
- Place of death: Toronto, Canada
- Position: Goalkeeper

Senior career*
Years	Team	Apps	(Gls)
1951–1953	Banbridge Town		
1953–1962	Glenavon	219	(0)
1961	→ Toronto Italia (loan)		
1962–1963	Glentoran	21	(0)
1963–1966	Toronto Italia		
1967–1970	Burnaby Villa		
- * Club domestic league appearances and goals

Robert "Roy" Rea (28 November 1934 – 5 April 2005) was a Northern Ireland international footballer who played in the Irish League as a goalkeeper with Glenavon and Glentoran. He won one 'B' cap, and four amateur caps for Northern Ireland and thirteen inter-league caps for the Irish League in the 1950s.

With Glenavon, he won the Irish League championship in 1956/57, two Irish Cups (1956/57 and 1958/59), one Gold Cup and one Ulster Cup. With Glentoran he won the Gold Cup in 1962/63; the same year in which he was named Ulster Footballer of the Year. In 1963, he played in the Eastern Canada Professional Soccer League with Toronto Italia.

Although he never won a full international cap, Rea was a member of the Northern Ireland squad at the 1958 World Cup, as the second reserve goalkeeper, but did not travel to Sweden.
