= Clancy McDermott =

Northern Ireland footballer (c.1920–2007)

Personal information
- Date of birth: c. 1920
- Place of birth: Belfast, Northern Ireland
- Date of death: December 2007 (aged 87)
- Position: Half back

Senior career*
Years	Team	Apps	(Gls)
1939–1946	Glentoran	10	(0)
1946–1949	Chelmsford City		
1949–1951	Glentoran	9	(0)
1951	Fulham	0	(0)
1951–1961	Coleraine		
1961–1964	Bangor		
1964–1965	Carrick Rangers		
- * Club domestic league appearances and goals

J. Clarence McDermott (c. 1920 – December 2007) was a footballer from Northern Ireland who played in the Irish League with Glentoran and Coleraine from 1939 to 1963. With the Glens, he won the Gold Cup in 1941–42, and with Coleraine he also won the Gold Cup (1958–59) as well as the City Cup in 1954–55. He was capped once by the Irish League in 1949. He was the Ulster Footballer of the Year for the 1958–59 season.

== Sources ==
- Northern Ireland's Footballing Greats
- Clancy McDermott's obituary
