= Albert Campbell (footballer) =

Northern Irish footballer (1938–2022)

Personal information
- Date of birth: 4 January 1938
- Place of birth: Belfast, Northern Ireland
- Date of death: October 2022 (aged 84)
- Height: 6 ft 0 in (1.83 m)
- Position: Centre-half

Senior career*
Years	Team	Apps	(Gls)
1954–1970	Crusaders	529	(26)

International career
1959	Northern Ireland B	1	(0)
1963–1964	Northern Ireland	2	(0)
- * Club domestic league appearances and goals

Albert Campbell (4 January 1938 – October 2022) was a Northern Irish footballer who played with Crusaders in the Irish League in the 1950s and 60s. At international level he won two full international caps for Northern Ireland (the first Crusaders player to be capped): against Wales in the 1963 Home Internationals and Switzerland in a World Cup match in 1964. He also won a 'B' international cap against France in 1959.

With Crusaders, he won the Ulster Cup and County Antrim Shield, and was part of the club's first Irish Cup-winning teams in 1967 and 1968. He was named the Ulster Footballer of the Year for the 1960/61 season.

Campbell died in October 2022, at the age of 84.
