= Billy McAvoy =

Northern Ireland footballer (c.1949–??)

Personal information
- Full name: William McAvoy
- Date of birth: c. 1949 (age 76–77)
- Place of birth: Newtownards, Northern Ireland
- Position: Inside right

Senior career*
Years	Team	Apps	(Gls)
1964–1977	Ards		
1977–1978	Ballymena United		
- * Club domestic league appearances and goals

Billy McAvoy was a Northern Irish footballer who played in the Irish League as an inside-right with Ards in the 1960s and 1970s. McAvoy won one international cap for the Northern Ireland under-23 team. He also played for the Northern Ireland amateur team and earned one cap for the Irish League representative side.

With Ards, McAvoy won two Irish Cups (1968–69 and 1973–74), as well as the Ulster Cup, Gold Cup, County Antrim Shield and Blaxnit Cup. In 1968–69 he was named Ulster Footballer of the Year.

For almost 50 years, McAvoy had been the last player to achieve the feat of scoring a hat trick in an Irish Cup final, having done so in Ards' 4–2 win over Distillery in the 1969 final replay. This feat was not emulated until 2017, when Andrew Waterworth scored three against Coleraine in the 2017 Irish Cup final.
