= Vinny Arkins =

Irish footballer

Personal information
- Full name: Vincent Thomas Arkins
- Date of birth: 18 September 1970 (age 56)
- Place of birth: Dublin, Ireland
- Position: Striker

Youth career
- –1986: Stella Maris
- 1986–1987: Home Farm

Senior career*
Years	Team	Apps	(Gls)
1987–1989	Dundee United	0	(0)
1989–1991	Shamrock Rovers	67	(28)
1991–1993	St Johnstone	48	(11)
1993–1995	Shelbourne	54	(21)
1995–1997	Notts County	38	(8)
1997–2006	Portadown	279	(179)
2006	Bohemians	16	(2)
2007	St Patrick's Athletic	0	(0)
Total		502	(249)

International career
1986	Republic of Ireland U17	1	(0)
1991–1995	League of Ireland XI	3	(0)
1990–1992	Republic of Ireland U21	8	(1)
1992	Republic of Ireland B	1	(0)
2000	Irish League XI	1	(1)

Managerial career
- 2010–2013: Balydoyle United
- 2016: Portadown (interim manager)
- * Club domestic league appearances and goals

Vincent Thomas Arkins (born 18 September 1970) is an Irish retired footballer who played as a striker during a 20-year career. He is most notable for his time with Portadown in Northern Ireland, where he is their all-time leading goalscorer and also briefly managed the club on an interim basis after retiring. He also played for clubs in his native Ireland, Scotland and England.

== Club career ==
Arkins scored 15 goals as Dundee United's youth team made it to the Scottish Youth Cup Final in 1989. After signing for Noel King for £12,000 he made his League of Ireland debut for Shamrock Rovers against Bohemians on 15 October 1989 in a 3–1 win. Arkins went on to score 35 goals in 86 total appearances for The Hoops.

He won the Player of the Year award in his first season as well as sharing the PFAI Young Player of the Year award and was top club goalscorer that season and in 1990–91. He was also the first player to score at Rovers rented ground, the RDS Arena, on 14 October 1990.

Despite agreeing personal terms with Liam Brady to join Celtic in November 1991 the deal fell through as it was conditional on Celtic offloading some of their seven strikers. This deal would have been worth £80,000 to Rovers with the bonus of home and away friendlies between the clubs.

In his last game for Rovers he scored against Galway at the RDS Arena

Arkins joined St Johnstone for a reputed transfer fee of £40,000 with additional bonuses based on appearances in November 1991 Under the terms of the transfer fee to Rovers in 1989 Dundee United were entitled to half of this transfer fee. He scored his first goal at Ibrox Stadium in December in a 3–1 defeat.

He returned home to sign for Shelbourne in 1993 and made his European bow in the 1993–94 European Cup Winners' Cup at FC Karpaty Lviv. Arkins was named on the best league XI for the 1994–95 League of Ireland Premier Division season after scoring 13 league goals. He played in the 1995 FAI Cup final loss to Derry City.

In July 1995 Arkins confirmed he had signed a two-year contract at Shelbourne.

He played in the 1995–96 UEFA Cup clashes with Íþróttabandalag Akraness, getting sent off in Iceland.

The following month he opened the scoring in a friendly against Manchester United in a game that finished 2–2.

He signed for Notts County from Shelbourne in September 1995, joining the recently departed Shelbourne manager Colin Murphy at Meadow Lane.

In February 1997 he joined Portadown for £10,000 and scored on his debut at home to Coleraine.

He made his European bow against PFC CSKA Sofia in the 1999–2000 UEFA Cup.

On his only appearance representing the Irish League he scored against the League of Ireland XI at Terryland Park in November 2000.

He was a prolific goalscorer, scoring 248 goals in 404 appearances during his nine-year spell with Portadown. He was an Irish League winner with Portadown in 2001/02. Arkins was the top scorer in the Irish League on five occasions.

He remains the only player from the Republic of Ireland to be top scorer in the Northern Irish Premiership. In July 2002 he scored at FC Belshina Bobruisk in the 2002–03 UEFA Champions League.

Arkins scored in the 2005–06 UEFA Cup against Viking FK.

He made 10 appearances in European competition for the Ports.

In January 2006 he signed for Bohemians.

His last senior goal was scored for Bohs against Bray on 12 May 2006 and his last senior appearance was on 29 August in a losing 2006 FAI Cup tie against his first LOI club Shamrock Rovers where he sustained a long-term injury that forced him eventually into retirement. He did subsequently sign for St Patrick's Athletic on a short-term deal but never actually appeared in a competitive game for the Saints due to his growing family.

== International career ==
Arkins won representative honours with the League of Ireland XI and the Irish League XI, as well as eight Republic Ireland U21, one B, four schoolboy and three youth caps. Arkins scoring the winner against Turkey in October 1990.

== Honours ==
- Irish League
  - Portadown 2001/2002
- Irish Cup: 2
  - Portadown 1998/99, 2004/05
- Mid-Ulster Cup: 3
  - Portadown 1997/1998, 2001/2002, 2002/2003
- Irish FA Charity Shield
  - Portadown 1999/2000
- LFA President's Cup:
  - Shelbourne 1993
- PFAI Young Player of the Year:
  - Shamrock Rovers – 1989/1990
- SRFC Player of the Year:
  - Shamrock Rovers – 1989/1990
- Ulster Footballer of the Year
  - Portadown 1999/2000
- Northern Ireland Football Writers' Association Player of the Year:2
  - Portadown 1999/2000, 2001/2002
