= Davy O'Hare =

Northern Irish footballer

Personal information
- Date of birth: 2 March 1972 (age 54)
- Place of birth: Newry, Northern Ireland
- Position: Goalkeeper

Youth career
- Newry City

Senior career*
Years	Team	Apps	(Gls)
1991–1997	Coleraine		
1997	→ Newry City (loan)	4	(0)
1997–2000	Crusaders	101	(0)
2000–2002	Newry City	71	(0)
2002–2011	Coleraine	270	(1)
2011–2013	Glenavon	27	(0)
- * Club domestic league appearances and goals

David O'Hare (born 2 March 1972) is a Northern Irish former footballer who played as a goalkeeper

== Career ==
O'Hare was a member of the 2003 Irish Cup winning Coleraine team which beat Glentoran 1–0 in the final at Windsor Park. He made his 500th appearance for the club against Linfield on 9 February 2010. Prior to his spell at Coleraine he played for Crusaders from 1997 to 2000.

He scored a goal for Coleraine from a goal kick in a league match against Lisburn Distillery at New Grosvenor in September 2003.

In May 2010, he agreed a new one-year contract to extend his stay at the Coleraine Showgrounds.

In April 2011 the club announced that he would leave the club after almost 500 appearances across two spells with the club.

On 13 June 2011, he signed for Glenavon. On 29 April 2013 after his final game for Glenavon he retired from football.
