= Rory Patterson =

Northern Irish footballer (born 1984)

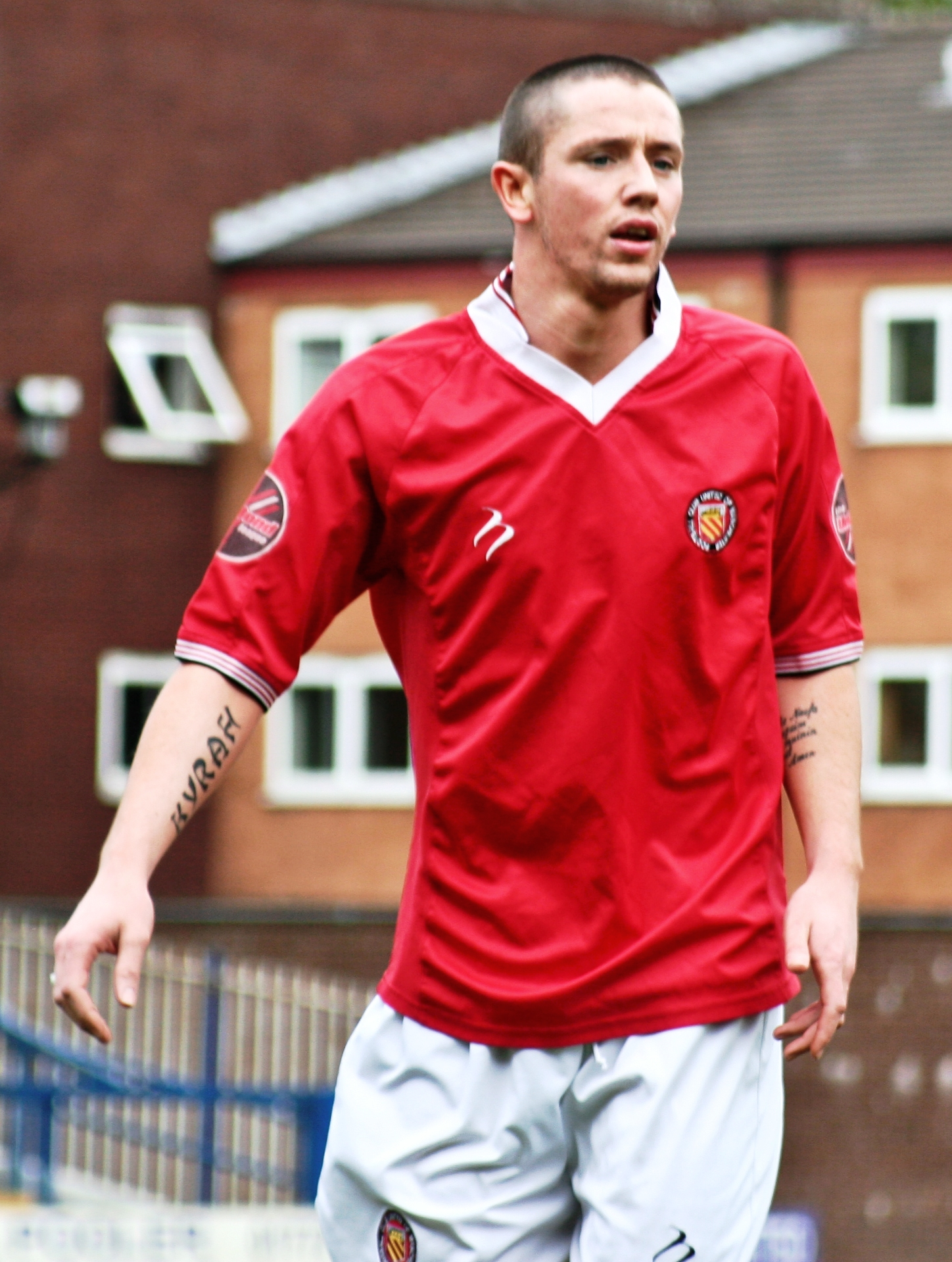
- Patterson playing for FC United of Manchester in 2008

Personal information
- Full name: Rory Christopher Patterson
- Date of birth: 16 July 1984 (age 42)
- Place of birth: Strabane, Northern Ireland
- Height: 5 ft 11 in (1.80 m)
- Position: Forward

Team information
- Current team: Belfast Celtic

Youth career
- Sion Swifts
- Moorfield Celtic
- Townsend United

Senior career*
Years	Team	Apps	(Gls)
2002–2004	Rochdale	15	(0)
2004	Radcliffe Borough	8	(1)
2004–2005	Mossley	6	(0)
2005–2008	FC United of Manchester	129	(99)
2008–2009	Bradford Park Avenue	20	(11)
2009	Droylsden	5	(2)
2009–2010	Coleraine	33	(30)
2010–2012	Plymouth Argyle	35	(4)
2011–2012	→ Linfield (loan)	18	(4)
2012–2014	Derry City	65	(34)
2015	Cockburn City	19	(20)
2015	FC United of Manchester	5	(0)
2016–2018	Derry City	73	(29)
2018–2019	Crusaders	29	(10)
2019–2020	Ballymacash Rangers	23	(21)
2020–2021	Belfast Celtic	0	(0)
2021	Dungannon Swifts	17	(2)
2021–2023	Strabane Athletic		
2023–	Belfast Celtic		

International career^{‡}
2010–2014	Northern Ireland	5	(1)

Managerial career
- 2021–2023: Strabane Athletic (Player/Manager)
- * Club domestic league appearances and goals as of 16:26, 3 May 2019 (UTC) ‡ National team caps and goals as of 16:26, 3 May 2019 (UTC)

Rory Christopher Patterson (born 16 July 1984) is a Northern Irish footballer who plays as a forward for Belfast Celtic He also played for the Northern Ireland national team. Having played youth football for Sion Swifts, Moorfield Celtic and Townsend United, Patterson joined Rochdale in 2002 before having spells with Radcliffe Borough and Mossley.

In 2005, he joined the newly formed club FC United of Manchester, where he stayed until 2008 becoming their all-time top goalscorer in the process, scoring 99 times. He subsequently joined up with Bradford Park Avenue before having a short spell with Droylsden. In 2009, he moved back to Northern Ireland to join Coleraine where he had a successful one season spell – scoring 30 league goals, and he subsequently joined Glentoran before moving back to England to join League One side Plymouth Argyle.

After a two-year spell with League of Ireland Premier Division club Derry City, Patterson moved to Western Australian side Cockburn City in January 2015, before returning to FC United of Manchester in October 2015. After another spell at Derry City he moved to Crusaders in August 2018. He signed for intermediate side Ballymacash Rangers in September 2019.

== Early life ==
Patterson was born in Strabane, County Tyrone.

== Club career ==
Patterson played junior football in his native Northern Ireland before becoming a trainee with Rochdale. Turning professional in the 2002 close season, Patterson's first team debut came in October 2002 as an 86th-minute substitute for Gareth Griffiths as Rochdale lost 1–0 at home to Bury in the Football League Trophy. He made his league debut the following month, again as a substitute, this time in the 64th minute for Lee McEvilly, as Rochdale lost 2–0 away to Oxford United. He made a further seven appearances, all in the Football League that season. Nine first team appearances came the following season, with Patterson released by Rochdale, despite being voted their 'Young Player of the Year'.

He joined Radcliffe Borough in July 2004. After an impressive start to the following season, his performances tailed off and he was released in November 2004, signing for Mossley.

Patterson signed for FC United of Manchester in 2005, and made 126 appearances and scoring 99 goals for the club in all competitions. He was promoted in all of his three seasons with F.C. United and twice finished as top-scorer.

After much transfer speculation, Patterson signed for Bradford Park Avenue in July 2008, along with his ex-FC United strike partner, Stuart Rudd. Patterson was credited with a hat-trick during a pre-season tour game in Spain, but this later turned out to be a "wind-up" by club chairman Bob Blackburn. Patterson was on a family holiday in Majorca at the time of his game.

In 2009, Patterson signed for Droylsden after a season plagued by injury, though he still managed to get into double figures for Bradford PA. On 27 June 2009, Patterson left Droylsden to sign for IFA Premiership side Coleraine. On his debut for Coleraine in a friendly against Garvagh, he scored a first half hat-trick. He scored ten goals in eight pre-season friendlies for the Bannsiders before marking his competitive debut with a goal in the 2–2 draw with Linfield on 8 August 2009. He then went on to record a hat-trick in the 3–2 derby win over Ballymena United on 18 August.

On 7 November 2009, Patterson scored four times as Coleraine beat defending champions Glentoran 6–0 at The Oval. On 4 December 2009, Patterson was awarded with the Football Writers Player of the Month for November. On top of this, he also picked up Goal of the Month for his first of four goals against Glentoran. Patterson scored his first Irish Cup goal for Coleraine against IFA Championship 2 side Dundela. He finished the 2009/10 season having scored 41 goals for Coleraine, with 30 goals in the Premiership and the rest in various other competitions, and was named Ulster Footballer of the Year.

Patterson joined Glentoran in the summer of 2010, having signed a pre-contract agreement with the club earlier in the year. However, in June 2010, it was announced that Patterson had joined Plymouth Argyle, after impressing at a trial in March, and that an "undisclosed fee" had been agreed with Glentoran despite him never joining the Northern Irish club.

On 14 August 2010 he made his home debut as a first-half substitute in a match against Carlisle United. He scored a late goal in the 94th minute which allowed Plymouth Argyle to draw the match. Patterson returned to Northern Ireland in July 2011, joining Linfield on loan until the end of the 2011–12 season. Having scored four goals in 18 league matches by January 2012, Patterson ended his loan spell with Linfield to join Derry City on a two-year contract. His competitive debut for the club saw him score a hat-trick in a 4–0 defeat of Lisburn Distillery in the Setanta Cup.

In the 2014–15 UEFA Europa League Patterson scored four over two legs as Derry beat Aberystwyth Town

In January 2015, Patterson signed for NPL Western Australia club Cockburn City, scoring 19 goals in 20 matches for the team.

In October 2015, seven years after leaving the club, Patterson returned to FC United of Manchester, for whom he remains the second highest goalscorer with 99 goals in all official competitions.

In December 2015 he signed for Derry City for a second time.

Overall he made five appearances for the Candystripes in European football.

In August 2018, he joined NIFL Premiership champions Crusaders.

In September 2019, Patterson joined Mid-Ulster Football League side Ballymacash Rangers. A key motive behind the move was to link up with former Linfield teammate Michael Gault, who managed Ballymacash at the time of Patterson's signing. Patterson departed the club one year later after 21 goals in 23 appearances, moving on to Ballymena & Provincial Football League side Belfast Celtic for the 2020–21 season. However, due to the COVID-19 pandemic, all football activity in Northern Ireland below the NIFL Premiership was cancelled, and Patterson moved to Premiership side Dungannon Swifts on 31 January 2021 without playing a competitive game for Belfast Celtic.

In August 2021 he joined Strabane Athletic and in October was appointed as player-manager.

In September 2023 he rejoined Belfast Celtic at the age of 39.

== International career ==
Patterson was involved with the Northern Ireland under 19 squad in 2002, however he accepted a call up to the Republic of Ireland under 19 squad to play in the European Championships in 2003. Before Patterson could join up with the squad, he was ruled out by injury. Patterson received his first call-up to the Northern Ireland squad in February 2010, when Nigel Worthington named him in his squad to face Albania and made his debut as a substitute, earning praise from manager Nigel Worthington for his performance. He was then named in the squad again in May 2010 for a two match tour and it was announced that he would play as a lone striker in a match against Turkey. He scored his first international goal, a penalty, on 17 November 2010 in a friendly against Morocco to level the scores late in the game, playing the full 90 minutes.

=== International goals ===
Goal	Date	Venue	Opponent	Score	Result	Competition
1.	17 November 2010	Windsor Park, Belfast	Morocco	1–1	Draw	Friendly

== Honours ==
FC United of Manchester

- Northern Premier League President's Cup: 2007–08
- North West Counties League Division One: 2006–07
- North West Counties League Challenge Cup: 2006–07
- North West Counties League Division Two: 2005–06
- Supporters Direct Cup: 2006
- Jimmy Davis Memorial Cup: 2007

Derry City

- FAI Cup: 2012

Crusaders

- Irish Cup: 2018–19
- County Antrim Shield: 2018–19

Individual

- Ulster Footballer of the Year: 2009–10
- PFAI Premier Division Team of the Year: 2013
