= Julie O'Connor =

Julie O'Connor is a Northern Irish journalist.

== Broadcasting career ==
O'Connor joined UTV as a reporter in 2003. She previously worked as a reporter for the Belfast Telegraph.
