= Mickey Keenan =

Northern Ireland footballer

Personal information
- Date of birth: 5 April 1956 (age 70)
- Place of birth: Newry, Northern Ireland
- Position: Goalkeeper

Youth career
- Newry Town

Senior career*
Years	Team	Apps	(Gls)
1974–1978	Oldham Athletic	0	(0)
1978–1981	Newry Town		
1981–1998	Portadown		
1998–1999	Ards	19	(0)
1999–2003	Portadown	67	(0)
2003–2004	Lisburn Distillery	1	(0)
- * Club domestic league appearances and goals

Michael Keenan (born 5 April 1956) is a Northern Irish retired goalkeeper. He was successful with Portadown during the 1990s and early 2000s, where he won four league titles and several cup winner medals, as well as being named the Ulster Footballer of the Year for the 2001–02 season.

He played for Oldham Athletic, Newry Town, Ards, and Lisburn Distillery. In 2002, he became the oldest person to play in the UEFA Champions League when Portadown took part in a qualifying round against FC Belshina Bobruisk. After retiring as a player, Mickey returned to Newry as a goalkeeping coach and is now currently first team coach at Newry City.
