= Shayne Lavery =

Northern Irish footballer

- Lavery with Cambridge United in 2026

Personal information
- Full name: Shayne Francis Lavery
- Date of birth: 8 December 1998 (age 27)
- Place of birth: Aghagallon, County Antrim, Northern Ireland
- Height: 5 ft 11 in (1.80 m)
- Position: Forward

Team information
- Current team: Cambridge United
- Number: 19

Youth career
- Oxford Sunnyside
- Portadown
- –2015: Glenavon
- 2015–2019: Everton

Senior career*
Years	Team	Apps	(Gls)
2017–2019	Everton	0	(0)
2019	→ Falkirk (loan)	6	(0)
2019–2021	Linfield	56	(33)
2021–2024	Blackpool	95	(15)
2024–	Cambridge United	58	(15)

International career^{‡}
2015	Northern Ireland U17	3	(2)
2016	Northern Ireland U19	5	(1)
2016–	Northern Ireland U21	14	(5)
2018–	Northern Ireland	19	(3)
- * Club domestic league appearances and goals as of 08:32, 7 November 2026 (UTC) ‡ National team caps and goals as of 22:22, 19 June 2023 (UTC)

Shayne Francis Lavery (born 8 December 1998) is a Northern Irish professional footballer who plays as a striker for Cambridge United. He has also represented the Northern Ireland national team. He has previously played for Everton, Falkirk and Linfield.

== Early and personal life ==
Lavery attended St Michael's Grammar School in Lurgan. His older brother Conor played youth football for Manchester United.

== Club career ==
Lavery played youth football for Oxford Sunnyside, Portadown and Glenavon. He was an unused substitute for Glenavon's first team in December 2014.

In March 2015, Lavery moved to Everton following a successful trial. On 6 December 2017, Lavery was named in Everton's first-team squad for the Europa League match away to Apollon Limassol but was an unused substitute.

Lavery moved on loan to Scottish Championship club Falkirk in January 2019. Following the end of his loan, Lavery departed Everton at the end of the 2018–19 season.

On 31 May 2019, it was announced that Lavery had joined Linfield on a one-year deal. His deal was then extended by another year in May 2020.

Lavery signed for Blackpool on 1 July 2021 on a two-year contract, with an option of a further 12 months. He scored, deep into injury time, on his debut as a second-half substitute in a 1–1 draw at Bristol City on 7 August.

On 7 May 2024, Blackpool announced the player would be leaving the club in the summer when his contract expired.

On 1 July 2024, Lavery joined League One side Cambridge United on a two-year deal. He scored his first goals for the club on 24 August, in a 4–4 draw with Blackpool in League One. On 6 May 2026, the club announced he was being released.

== International career ==
Lavery played for Northern Ireland at under-17, under-19 and under-21 youth levels.

He received his first call up to the Northern Ireland senior team in March 2018, and made his senior debut against Panama in May 2018.

Lavery's first international goal came on 2 September 2021 against Lithuania in Vilnius, in a 2022 World Cup qualifier which Northern Ireland went on to win 4–1.

== Career statistics ==
=== Club ===
As of match played 6 November 2026

Appearances and goals by club, season and competition
Club	Season	League			National Cup		League Cup		Other		Total	
Club	Season	Division	Apps	Goals	Apps	Goals	Apps	Goals	Apps	Goals	Apps	Goals
Glenavon	2014–15	NIFL Premiership	0	0	0	0	0	0	0	0	0	0
Everton	2015–16	Premier League	0	0	0	0	0	0	—		0	0
Everton	2016–17	Premier League	0	0	0	0	0	0	—		0	0
Everton	2017–18	Premier League	0	0	0	0	0	0	0	0	0	0
Everton	2018–19	Premier League	0	0	0	0	0	0	—		0	0
Everton	Total		0	0	0	0	0	0	0	0	0	0
Everton U23	2017–18	—			—		—		2 (Note: Appearances in EFL Trophy)	0	2	0
Everton U23	2018–19	—			—		—		3	1	3	1
Falkirk (loan)	2018–19	Scottish Championship	6	0	0	0	0	0	0	0	6	0
Linfield	2019–20	NIFL Premiership	25	10	2	0	0	0	8 (Note: Two appearances in UEFA Champions League, six appearances and four goals in UEFA Europa League)	4	35	14
Linfield	2020–21	NIFL Premiership	31	23	4	7	—		3	0	38	30
Linfield	Total		62	33	6	7	0	0	16	5	84	45
Blackpool	2021–22	EFL Championship	37	8	1	0	2	2	—		40	10
Blackpool	2022–23	EFL Championship	27	2	2	0	1	0	—		30	2
Blackpool	2023–24	EFL League One	31	5	2	1	0	0	3	0	36	6
Blackpool	Total		95	15	5	1	3	2	3	0	106	18
Cambridge United	2024–25	League One	15	5	1	0	1	0	0	0	17	5
Cambridge United	2025–26	League Two	30	7	1	0	1	0	0	0	32	7
Cambridge United	2026–27	League One	13	3	1	0	2	0	1	0	17	3
Cambridge United	Total		58	15	3	0	4	0	1	0	66	15
Career total			215	63	14	8	7	2	20	5	256	78

=== International ===
As of match played 8 September 2024

Appearances and goals by national team and year
National team	Year	Apps	Goals
Northern Ireland	2018	1	0
Northern Ireland	2019	3	0
Northern Ireland	2020	1	0
Northern Ireland	2021	4	1
Northern Ireland	2022	8	2
Northern Ireland	2023	2	0
Northern Ireland	2024	1	0
Total		20	3

Scores and results list Northern Ireland's goal tally first, score column indicates score after each Lavery goal.

List of international goals scored by Shayne Lavery
No.	Date	Venue	Opponent	Cap	Score	Result	Competition
1	2 September 2021	LFF Stadium, Vilnius, Lithuania	Lithuania	8	3–1	4–1	2022 FIFA World Cup qualification
2	9 June 2022	Fadil Vokrri Stadium, Pristina, Kosovo	Kosovo	14	1–2	2–3	2022–23 UEFA Nations League C
3	27 September 2022	Georgios Kamaras Stadium, Athens, Greece	Greece	17	1-1	1-3	2022-23 UEFA Nations League C

== Honours ==
Linfield

- NIFL Premiership: 2019–20, 2020–21
- Irish Cup: 2020–21

Individual

- Ulster Footballer of the Year: 2020–21
- NIFWA Player of the Year: 2020–21
