= Mourneview Park =

Football stadium in Lurgan, Northern Ireland

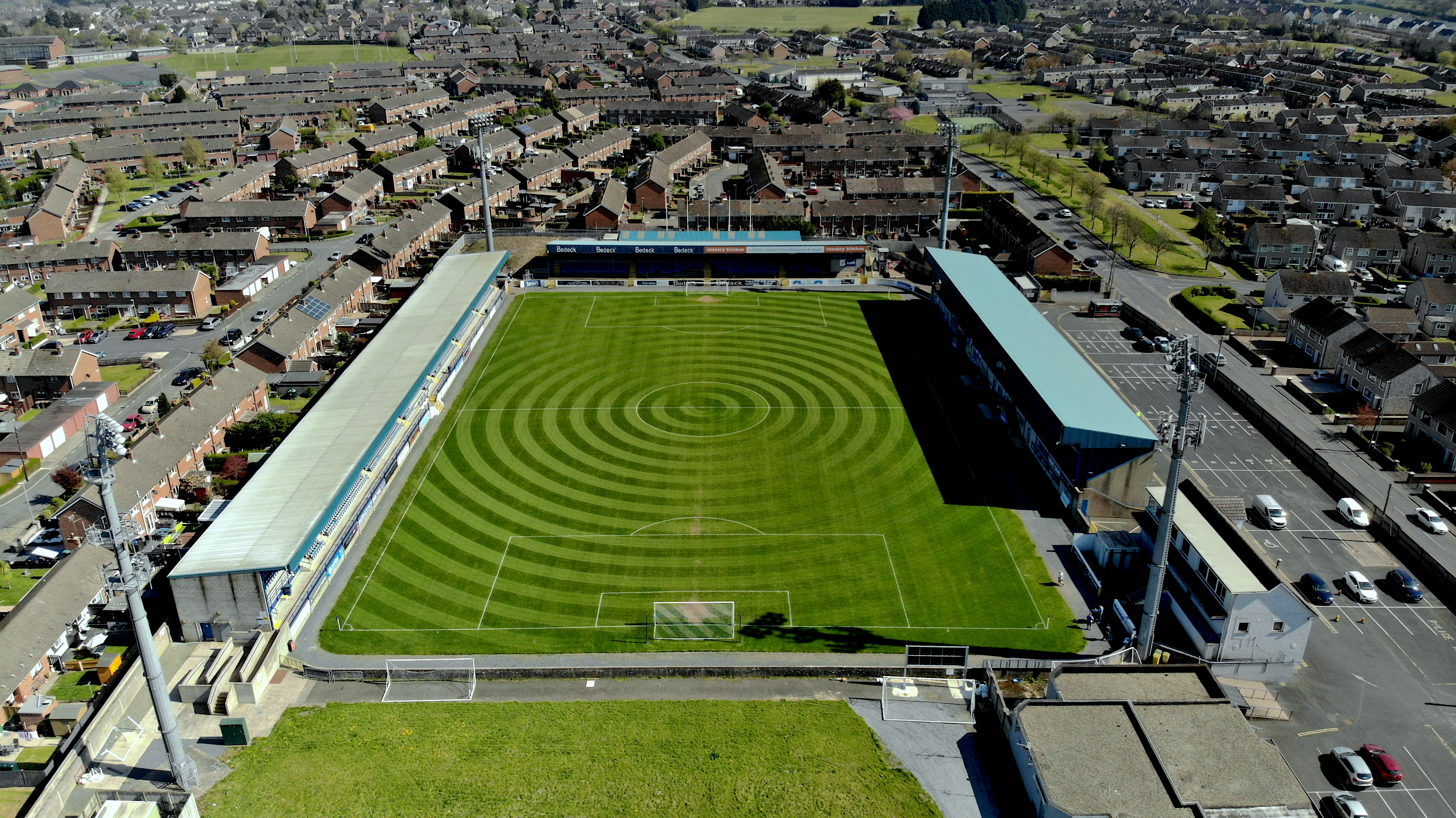
- Interactive map of Mourneview Park
- Location: Mourneview Avenue, Lurgan, County Armagh, Northern Ireland
- Coordinates: 54°27′14″N 6°20′11″W
- Owner: Glenavon Football Club
- Capacity: 4,160 (safe capacity apx. 3,200)
- Surface: Grass

Construction
- Opened: 1895

Mourneview Park is a football stadium in Lurgan, County Armagh, Northern Ireland, and is the home ground of NIFL Premiership club Glenavon. The stadium holds 4,160 and was originally built in 1895. The 2008–09 Irish League Cup, 2010–11 Irish League Cup and 2020-21 Irish Cup finals were held at the stadium.

== History ==
Between 1992 and 2011, Mourneview Park underwent a number of significant renovations, including the building of three new seated stands. Mourneview Park has been used by the Irish Football Association to host neutral matches in the past. In 2003, the Irish Football Association removed Mourneview Park as a potential semi-final host for the Irish Cup because of rioting between fans of Glentoran and Portadown.

Mourneview Park has previously been attacked by arsonists, including in 2005 when a petrol bomb was thrown into a supporters club bar which destroyed it, leading to Glenavon considering closing Mourneview Park because of the continuous damage.

In 2009, it was selected to host the 2009 Irish League Cup final because neither of Belfast's Big Two made it to the final and it would have been harder for fans of finalists Newry City and Portadown to get to a Belfast venue. This was the same case for the 2011 Irish League Cup Final, with Mourneview Park being chosen because the finalists were Lisburn Distillery and Portadown, 2 of the closest Premiership clubs to Mourneview Park at that time. The two League Cup finals held at Mourneview Park were the first to be staged outside of Belfast.

In 2014, Mourneview Park was nominated by Belfast club Linfield to be their designated home ground for their home matches in the UEFA Europa League after their normal home ground, Windsor Park was undergoing redevelopment.

Mourneview Park was chosen as the venue for the 2015 Irish Cup semi-final between Glentoran and Crusaders due to the unavailability of Windsor Park ahead of a Northern Ireland international fixture. The ground was further used for semi-finals in the 2016–17, 2018–19, and 2020-21 editions of the competition.

In September 2020, Glenavon FC unveiled a new 5m x 2m Digital LED Screen at Mourneview Park. It is the first of its kind anywhere in Ireland.

On 12 April 2021, it was announced that Mourneview Park would be the host venue for the 2020–21 Irish Cup Final; the first time the final has been staged outside of Belfast since 1975.

It was announced on 15 June 2021 that Mourneview Park would host the second leg of the first round tie in the inaugural edition of the Europa Conference League between FK Velež Mostar and Coleraine F.C. on 15 July 2021, due to pitch redevelopments at The Showgrounds.

Prior to the 2023–24 season commencing, the seated area of the Crescent End was returned back to a standing terrace, with the installation of safe standing.

=== International football ===
Mourneview Park has been used to host Northern Ireland national under-21 football team matches as well as matches involving the Northern Ireland women's national football team.

== Other uses ==
Mourneview Park has also been used for purposes outside of football. in 2014 it hosted a Christian evangelical event hosted by former Northern Ireland national football team player turned minister, Stuart Elliott.
