= 2020–21 NIFL Premiership =

NIFL Premiership
- Season: 2020–21
- Dates: 16 Oct 2020 – 29 May 2021
- Champions: Linfield; 7th Premiership title 55th Irish title
- Relegated: No Teams
- UEFA Champions League: Linfield
- UEFA Europa Conference League: Coleraine; Glentoran; Larne (via play-offs)
- Matches played: 228
- Goals scored: 674 (2.96 per match)
- Top goalscorer: Shayne Lavery (23 goals)
- Biggest home win: Linfield 7–0 Carrick Rangers (13 March 2021)
- Biggest away win: Carrick Rangers 0–5 Glentoran (5 March 2021); Warrenpoint Town 0–5 Cliftonville (3 April 2021)
- Highest scoring: Carrick Rangers 3–6 Glenavon (25 May 2021)

The 2020–21 NIFL Premiership (known as the Danske Bank Premiership for sponsorship reasons) was the 13th season of the NIFL Premiership, the highest level of league football in Northern Ireland, the 120th season of Irish League football overall, and the 8th season of the league operating as part of the Northern Ireland Football League.

Linfield were champions, winning the league for the 55th time and the 3rd consecutive season. The COVID-19 pandemic in Northern Ireland meant that the start of the season was delayed by approximately two months.

== Summary ==
The 38-game season commenced on 16 October 2020 and concluded on 29 May 2021, with the European play-offs then taking place on 1 and 5 June 2021. The fixtures were released on 19 September 2020.

Linfield were the two-time defending champions, having been league winners in the previous two seasons - the curtailed 2019–20 season seeing them win a then world record-equalling 54th league title. This season Linfield won a third consecutive title, once again equalling the world record for the most top flight league titles in club football, drawing level with Rangers, who had just won their 55th Scottish title two months earlier. Linfield entered the 2021–22 UEFA Champions League first qualifying round, while runners-up Coleraine and 3rd-placed Glentoran joined the European play-off winners, Larne, in the 2021–22 UEFA Europa Conference League first qualifying round.

There was no relegation from the Premiership this season, after a majority of NIFL Championship clubs voted to cancel their 2020–21 season, having not played any league fixtures since the 2019–20 season had initially been suspended in March 2020. The second and third tiers had not been granted 'elite' sporting status by the IFA which was required in order to continue playing matches during the COVID-19 pandemic lockdown.

== Teams ==
Locations of the 2020–21 NIFL Premiership teams
Locations of the Belfast-based 2020–21 NIFL Premiership teams

Twelve teams competed in the 2020–21 NIFL Premiership, eleven of which had retained their Premiership status from the previous season. Last season's bottom Premiership club, Institute, were relegated to the NIFL Championship after two seasons in the top flight, and were replaced by Portadown, who were promoted to this season's Premiership as 2019–20 NIFL Championship winners. This marked Portadown's return to the top flight for the first time since the 2016–17 season.

The promotion/relegation play-off did not take place the previous season, as a result of the COVID-19 pandemic.

=== Stadia and locations ===
Club	Stadium	Location	Capacity
Ballymena United	The Showgrounds	Ballymena	3,600 (all seated)
Carrick Rangers	Loughshore Hotel Arena	Carrickfergus	2,500 (250 seated)
Cliftonville	Solitude	Belfast	2,530 (all seated)
Coleraine	The Showgrounds	Coleraine	3,500 (1,106 seated)
Crusaders	Seaview	Belfast	3,383 (all seated)
Dungannon Swifts	Stangmore Park	Dungannon	2,000 (300 seated)
Glenavon	Mourneview Park	Lurgan	4,160 (3,200 seated)
Glentoran	The Oval	Belfast	6,054 (4,989 seated)
Larne	Inver Park	Larne	2,000 (1,250 seated)
Linfield	Windsor Park	Belfast	18,614 (all seated)
Portadown	Shamrock Park	Portadown	3,940 (2,765 seated)
Warrenpoint Town	Milltown	Warrenpoint	1,280 (150 seated)

== League table ==
Pos	Team	Pld	W	D	L	GF	GA	GD	Pts	Qualification or relegation (Note: Teams played each other three times (33 matches), before the league split into two groups (the top six and the bottom six) for the last five matches.)
1	Linfield (C)	38	24	6	8	83	38	+45	78	Qualification for the Champions League first qualifying round
2	Coleraine	38	21	10	7	57	35	+22	73	Qualification for the Europa Conference League first qualifying round (Note: Since 2020–21 Irish Cup winners Linfield qualified for the Champions League, the 3rd-placed team, Glentoran, also entered the Europa Conference League first qualifying round)
3	Glentoran	38	20	11	7	65	32	+33	71	Qualification for the Europa Conference League first qualifying round
4	Larne (O)	38	18	10	10	64	41	+23	64	Qualification for the Europa Conference League play-offs (Note: Larne qualified for the Europa Conference League first qualifying round as Europa Conference League play-off winners.)
5	Cliftonville	38	17	9	12	59	42	+17	60	Qualification for the Europa Conference League play-offs
6	Crusaders	38	16	6	16	62	50	+12	54	Qualification for the Europa Conference League play-offs
7	Glenavon	38	17	11	10	72	65	+7	62 (Note: After 33 games, clubs in the bottom half of the table at the split cannot climb into the top half, regardless of the results during matches 34–38.)	Qualification for the Europa Conference League play-offs
8	Ballymena United	38	18	7	13	67	44	+23	61	
9	Portadown	38	10	6	22	50	78	−28	36	
10	Warrenpoint Town	38	9	9	20	38	74	−36	36	
11	Carrick Rangers	38	5	8	25	35	92	−57	23	
12	Dungannon Swifts	38	4	5	29	22	83	−61	17	

Source: Northern Ireland Football League
Rules for classification: 1) Points; 2) Goal difference; 3) Number of goals scored; 4) Head-to-head points; 5) Head-to-head goal difference; 6) Drawing of lots
(C) Champions; (O) Play-off winners

== Results ==
=== Matches 1–22 ===
During matches 1–22 each team played every other team twice (home and away).

Home \ Away	BYM	CRK	CLF	COL	CRU	DUN	GLA	GLT	LAR	LIN	POR	WPT
Ballymena United	—	2–0	1–1	0–1	1–4	0–1	0–2	1–1	1–1	2–3	2–1	2–0
Carrick Rangers	0–2	—	0–1	0–2	1–3	0–0	3–4	0–5	1–2	1–1	4–1	1–3
Cliftonville	0–4	3–0	—	0–2	2–2	3–0	1–1	1–0	1–0	4–3	5–0	3–0
Coleraine	0–1	3–0	2–2	—	2–1	2–0	0–0	2–1	0–2	0–2	1–1	2–1
Crusaders	2–1	1–3	1–0	1–0	—	3–1	0–1	2–0	3–3	1–2	5–0	4–0
Dungannon Swifts	1–5	0–2	2–1	2–0	2–1	—	1–2	0–1	0–2	0–2	0–3	0–2
Glenavon	2–1	1–1	1–1	4–4	3–1	0–0	—	2–1	1–4	1–2	2–4	1–0
Glentoran	0–2	6–0	1–0	2–2	1–0	5–1	1–1	—	0–0	3–1	2–1	0–0
Larne	2–0	3–0	1–0	1–2	2–1	3–0	2–1	1–1	—	3–1	2–2	1–1
Linfield	2–1	5–1	2–0	0–0	2–1	4–0	2–0	3–3	2–1	—	3–0	6–0
Portadown	0–0	2–0	1–1	0–3	2–2	1–0	4–1	1–3	1–2	1–2	—	0–2
Warrenpoint Town	1–1	0–0	0–5	1–2	0–1	1–1	1–2	0–2	1–1	2–1	1–1	—

Source: Northern Ireland Football League
Legend: Blue = home team win; Yellow = draw; Red = away team win.
For upcoming matches, an "a" indicates there is an article about the rivalry between the two participants.

=== Matches 23–33 ===
During matches 23–33 each team played every other team for the third time (either at home, or away).

Home \ Away	BYM	CRK	CLF	COL	CRU	DUN	GLA	GLT	LAR	LIN	POR	WPT
Ballymena United	—	2–0	—	1–2	0–1	5–1	—	2–2	—	2–1	—	—
Carrick Rangers	—	—	—	—	1–1	1–1	—	—	1–3	—	5–3	1–1
Cliftonville	2–1	5–0	—	2–1	—	—	2–1	0–2	—	—	—	3–0
Coleraine	—	1–0	—	—	2–0	—	—	1–1	2–0	—	2–0	2–1
Crusaders	—	—	2–2	—	—	—	6–1	1–0	—	1–2	—	0–2
Dungannon Swifts	—	—	1–2	2–3	0–2	—	0–4	—	—	—	0–1	—
Glenavon	3–2	1–1	—	1–1	—	—	—	—	2–2	3–2	—	—
Glentoran	—	2–0	—	—	—	2–0	3–1	—	3–2	—	4–0	—
Larne	0–1	—	0–0	—	0–3	3–0	—	—	—	1–1	—	5–0
Linfield	—	7–0	2–0	2–1	—	2–0	—	0–1	—	—	—	5–0
Portadown	1–2	—	1–2	—	1–2	—	1–2	—	2–1	0–1	—	—
Warrenpoint Town	2–2	—	—	—	—	4–1	3–4	1–2	—	—	1–3	—

Source: Northern Ireland Football League
Legend: Blue = home team win; Yellow = draw; Red = away team win.
For upcoming matches, an "a" indicates there is an article about the rivalry between the two participants.

=== Matches 34–38 ===
For the final five matches the table was then split into two halves, with teams ranked 1st–6th in Section A and teams ranked 7th–12th in Section B. During matches 34–38 each team played every other team in their respective section once. The fixtures were reversed from those played during rounds 23–33, ensuring that teams had played every other team in their respective section twice at home and twice away overall throughout the season.

==== Section A ====
Home \ Away	CLF	COL	CRU	GLT	LAR	LIN
Cliftonville	—	—	1–1	—	1–2	0–2
Coleraine	2–0	—	—	—	—	1–1
Crusaders	—	0–1	—	—	1–3	—
Glentoran	0–2	1–1	2–0	—	—	0–0
Larne	—	1–2	—	0–1	—	—
Linfield	—	—	3–1	—	1–2	—

Source: Northern Ireland Football League
Legend: Blue = home team win; Yellow = draw; Red = away team win.
For upcoming matches, an "a" indicates there is an article about the rivalry between the two participants.

==== Section B ====
Home \ Away	BYM	CRK	DUN	GLA	POR	WPT
Ballymena United	—	—	—	3–1	4–2	3–0
Carrick Rangers	0–4	—	—	3–6	—	—
Dungannon Swifts	1–3	0–2	—	—	—	0–1
Glenavon	—	—	1–1	—	4–1	4–0
Portadown	—	2–1	4–2	—	—	1–2
Warrenpoint Town	—	3–1	—	—	—	—

Source: Northern Ireland Football League
Legend: Blue = home team win; Yellow = draw; Red = away team win.
For upcoming matches, an "a" indicates there is an article about the rivalry between the two participants.

== Play-offs ==
=== UEFA Europa Conference League play-offs ===
The play-offs were one-off matches with extra time and penalties used to determine the winner if necessary, with the higher-ranked teams given home advantage against the lower-ranked teams (i.e. 4th v. 7th and 5th v. 6th) in the semi-finals. The higher-ranked of the two semi-final winners also had home advantage in the final.

As Linfield won the 2020–21 Irish Cup and also qualified for the Champions League, the 3rd-placed team qualified for the Europa Conference League directly, vacating one of the play-off places. As a result, the remaining four clubs that finished in 4th–7th place competed for one place in the 2021–22 Europa Conference League first qualifying round.

The semi-finals were played on 1 June 2021, with the final played on 5 June 2021. Larne were the play-off winners, qualifying for European football for the first time in the club's history.

==== Semi-finals ====
1 June 2021
19:30 BST
Semi-final

Larne (4th)	2–1	Glenavon (7th)
McDaid 8'; Donnelly 90+3'	BBC Sport	Purkis 5'

Inver Park, Larne
Referee: Lee Tavinder

1 June 2021
19:30 BST
Semi-final

Cliftonville (5th)	0–0 (a.e.t.)	Crusaders (6th)
	BBC Sport
Penalties
Hale (penalty scored); O'Connor (penalty scored); R.Curran (penalty scored); O'Neill (penalty scored); Gormley (penalty scored)	5–4	Kennedy (penalty scored); Cushley (penalty scored); O'Rourke (penalty scored); Larmour (penalty scored); Ruddy (penalty missed)

Solitude, Belfast
Referee: Raymond Crangle

==== Final ====
5 June 2021
17:30 BST
Final

Larne (4th)	3–1	Cliftonville (5th)
McDaid 33', 80'; Lynch 64'	BBC Sport	O'Connor 59'

Inver Park, Larne

== Statistics ==
=== Top goalscorers ===
Rank	Scorer	Club	Goals
1	(Northern Ireland) Shayne Lavery	Linfield	23
2	(Northern Ireland) Shay McCartan	Ballymena United	18
3	(Northern Ireland) Jay Donnelly	Glentoran	17
4	(Northern Ireland) Ryan Curran	Cliftonville	15
4	(Northern Ireland) Andrew Waterworth	Linfield	15
6	(Northern Ireland) Lee Bonis	Portadown	14
6	(Northern Ireland) Ben Doherty	Coleraine	14
6	(Northern Ireland) Michael McCrudden	Cliftonville	14
9	(Northern Ireland) Matthew Fitzpatrick	Glenavon	13
9	(Northern Ireland) Daniel Purkis	Glenavon	13

=== Clean Sheets ===
Rank	Goalkeeper	Club	Clean sheets
1	(Northern Ireland) Chris Johns	Linfield	14
2	(Northern Ireland) Gareth Deane	Coleraine	10
2	(Northern Ireland) Conor Devlin	Larne	10
4	(Gibraltar) Dayle Coleing	Glentoran	8
5	(Republic of Ireland) Aaron McCarey	Cliftonville	7
5	(Northern Ireland) Jordan Williamson	Ballymena United	7
7	(Northern Ireland) Rory Brown	Glentoran	5
7	(Republic of Ireland) Craig Hyland	Glenavon	5
7	(Northern Ireland) Sean O'Neill	Crusaders	5
10	(England) Richard Brush	Cliftonville	4
