= George Dunlop (footballer) =

Northern Ireland footballer

Personal information
- Date of birth: January 16, 1956 (age 70)
- Place of birth: Belfast, Northern Ireland

International career
Years	Team	Apps	(Gls)
- Northern Ireland

George Dunlop (born 16 January 1956) is a former Northern Ireland international footballer.

== Career ==
During his club career he played as a goalkeeper for Manchester City, Glentoran, Ballymena United, Linfield, Larne and RUC. He was named Ulster Footballer of the Year for the 1980/81 season, while at Linfield.

=== International ===
He earned four caps for the Northern Ireland national football team and was part of the team at the 1982 FIFA World Cup when Northern Ireland reached the second round.

Dunlop won many medals as a part of the successful Linfield team that dominated Irish league football in the 1980s. He was a natural shot stopper with fast reactions and known for pulling off good saves.

Dunlop was known to supporters of other teams as 'The Elephant Man'.

== Personal life ==
His nephew is the former Rangers and Northern Ireland national under-21 football team player Josh Robinson.
