= John Devine (footballer, born 1969) =

Northern Irish former footballer

Personal information
- Date of birth: 27 January 1969 (age 57)
- Place of birth: Carrickfergus, Northern Ireland
- Position: Defender

Youth career
- Island Magee
- Chimney Corner
- Carnmoney Colts
- 1985–1987: Glentoran

Senior career*
Years	Team	Apps	(Gls)
1987–1999	Glentoran	272	(27)
1999–2002	Coleraine	68	(16)
2002–2003	Glenavon	31	(4)
2003–2004	Larne	0	(0)
2004–2005	Coleraine	1	(0)
Total		372	(47)

International career
1990	Northern Ireland U21	1	(0)
1990	Northern Ireland U23	1	(1)
1990	Northern Ireland	1	(0)

Managerial career
- 2003–2004: Larne
- * Club domestic league appearances and goals

John Devine (born 27 January 1969) is a Northern Irish former footballer who played at both semi-professional and international levels as a defender.

== Career ==
=== Club career ===
Born in Carrickfergus, Devine played youth-football with Island Magee, Chimney Corner and Carnmoney Colts, before playing senior football with Glentoran, Coleraine, Glenavon and Larne. He was Ulster Footballer of the Year and NIFWA Player of the Year in 1998–99. While at Larne, Devine was player-manager.

=== International career ===
In 1990, Devine represented Northern Ireland at both under-21 and under-23 levels, before making his senior debut later that same year.
