= Irish League representative team =

Irish league football team

The Irish League representative team was the representative side of the Irish Football League, the national league for football in Northern Ireland from 1922 and, prior to that the league for Ireland.

The Irish League was suspended from 1941–42 to 1946–47 due to the Second World War. As a replacement the Northern Ireland Regional League (a.k.a. the North Regional League) was organised and results listed below during this period are therefore for the Northern Ireland Regional League representative team.

From 2007 to 2010 the Irish Premier League was represented by the Northern Ireland Under-23 team in the International Challenge Trophy.

== Irish League representative match results ==
Date	Opponents	Result	Score	H-T Score	Venue	Attendance
29/04/1893	Scottish League XI	W	3–0	3–0	Ulsterville, Belfast	4000
27/01/1894	Scottish League XI	L	0–6	0–1	Celtic Park, Glasgow	3000
10/02/1894	Football League XI	L	2–4	0–3	Ulster Grounds, Belfast	5000
02/02/1895	Scottish League XI	L	1–4	1–3	Grosvenor Park, Belfast	6000
09/11/1895	Football League XI	D	2–2	2–0	Victoria Ground, Stoke	3000
11/11/1895	Liverpool	L	1–5	1–1	Anfield, Liverpool	500
15/02/1896	Scottish League XI	L	2–3	0–1	Celtic Park, Glasgow	5000
07/11/1896	Football League XI	L	0–2	0–1	The Oval, Belfast	12000
30/01/1897	Scottish League XI	L	0–2	0–1	Solitude, Belfast	10000
06/11/1897	Football League XI	L	1–8	0–1	Hyde Road, Manchester	10000
29/01/1898	Scottish League XI	L	0–5	0–5	Carolina Fort, Dundee	9000
05/11/1898	Football League XI	L	1–5	0–2	Grosvenor Park, Belfast	8000
11/02/1899	Scottish League XI	W	3–1	1–0	Solitude, Belfast	10000
11/11/1899	Football League XI	L	1–3	1–1	Burnden Park, Bolton	5372
17/02/1900	Scottish League XI	L	0–6	0–1	Easter Road, Edinburgh	9000
10/11/1900	Football League XI	L	2–4	1–1	Solitude, Belfast	7000
16/02/1901	Scottish League XI	L	1–2	1–1	The Oval, Belfast	9500
09/11/1901	Football League XI	L	0–9	0–3	Manor Ground, London	12000
15/02/1902	Scottish League XI	L	0–3	0–1	Dens Park, Dundee	
11/10/1902	Football League XI	L	2–3	2–1	Solitude, Belfast	10000
28/02/1903	Scottish League XI	W	1–0	1–0	Grosvenor Park, Belfast	11000
10/10/1903	Football League XI	L	1–2	1–1	Valley Parade, Bradford	17000
27/02/1904	Scottish League XI	L	1–3	1–2	Love Street, Paisley	10000
15/10/1904	Football League XI	L	0–2	0–2	Grosvenor Park, Belfast	12000
14/10/1905	Football League XI	L	0–4	0–1	Hyde Road, Manchester	13000
13/10/1906	Football League XI	L	0–6	0–2	Solitude, Belfast	10500
12/10/1907	Football League XI	L	3–6	2–4	Roker Park, Sunderland	6000
10/10/1908	Football League XI	L	0–5	0–2	Solitude, Belfast	12000
10/02/1909	Scottish League XI	L	1–2	0–1	Grosvenor Park, Belfast	8000
09/10/1909	Football League XI	L	1–8	0–2	Boundary Park, Oldham	10000
25/10/1909	Scottish League XI	L	0–2	0–0	Firhill Park, Glasgow	10000
08/10/1910	Football League XI	L	2–6	1–3	Celtic Park, Belfast	20000
31/10/1910	Scottish League XI	L	1–3	0–0	Grosvenor Park, Belfast	10000
20/03/1911	Southern League XI	L	0–4	0–2	Upton Park, London	5000
30/09/1911	Southern League XI	L	0–2	0–2	Windsor Park, Belfast	9000
16/10/1911	Football League XI	L	0–4	0–1	Anfield, Liverpool	10000
30/10/1911	Scottish League XI	L	0–3	0–0	Firhill Park, Glasgow	5000
23/10/1912	Football League XI	D	0–0	0–0	The Oval, Belfast	11500
06/11/1912	Scottish League XI	L	1–3	1–0	Windsor Park, Belfast	8500
15/03/1913	Southern League XI	D	1–1	1–0	The Den, London	13000
01/10/1913	Football League XI	L	0–2	0–1	Solitude, Belfast	12000
11/10/1913	Southern League XI	L	1–4	1–1	Dalymount Park, Dublin	6000
05/11/1913	Scottish League XI	L	1–2	0–0	Windsor Park, Belfast	9000
07/10/1914	Football League XI	L	1–2	0–0	The Hawthorns, West Bromwich	9250
31/10/1914	Southern League XI	D	1–1	1–1	Vetch Field, Swansea	8000
18/11/1914	Scottish League XI	L	1–2	1–2	Grosvenor Park, Belfast	7000
05/11/1919	Scottish League XI	L	0–2	0–1	Windsor Park, Belfast	4250
19/11/1919	Football League XI	D	2–2	0–1	Anfield, Liverpool	20000
25/01/1921	Scottish League XI	L	0–3	0–0	Ibrox Park, Glasgow	10000
01/10/1921	Football League XI	L	0–1	0–0	The Oval, Belfast	10000
26/10/1921	Scottish League XI	L	0–3	0–1	Shawfield Park, Rutherglen	15000
04/10/1922	Football League XI	L	1–5	1–4	Burnden Park, Bolton	10000
18/10/1922	Scottish League XI	L	0–3	0–1	Celtic Park, Glasgow	8000
17/03/1923	Welsh Football League XI	D	2–2	1–2	Solitude, Belfast	9000
29/09/1923	Football League XI	L	2–6	1–3	Windsor Park, Belfast	15000
31/10/1923	Scottish League XI	L	0–1	0–1	Windsor Park, Belfast	5000
11/10/1924	Football League XI	L	0–5	0–2	Solitude, Belfast	12000
29/10/1924	Scottish League XI	L	0–3	0–3	Tynecastle, Edinburgh	15000
11/05/1925	Ireland Amateur	L	1–5	?-?	Solitude, Belfast	
07/10/1925	Football League XI	L	1–5	1–3	Anfield, Liverpool	15000
11/11/1925	Scottish League XI	L	3–7	1–4	Solitude, Belfast	10000
13/03/1926	League of Ireland XI	L	1–3	0–1	Dalymount Park, Dublin	18000
09/10/1926	Football League XI	L	1–6	1–1	Celtic Park, Belfast	14000
27/10/1926	Scottish League XI	L	2–5	1–4	Tynecastle, Edinburgh	6850
05/03/1927	League of Ireland XI	D	1–1	1–1	Windsor Park, Belfast	15000
21/09/1927	Football League XI	L	1–9	0–9	St James' Park, Newcastle	1122
12/10/1927	Scottish League XI	L	1–2	0–1	Solitude, Belfast	8000
10/03/1928	League of Ireland XI	L	1–3	1–1	Shelbourne Park, Dublin	12000
22/09/1928	Football League XI	L	0–5	0–1	Windsor Park, Belfast	15000
31/10/1928	Scottish League XI	L	2–8	2–5	Firhill Park, Glasgow	16980
09/03/1929	League of Ireland XI	W	2–1	0–0	The Oval, Belfast	15000
25/09/1929	Football League XI	L	2–7	0–1	Goodison Park, Liverpool	18000
09/10/1929	Scottish League XI	L	1–4	0–2	Windsor Park, Belfast	10000
01/03/1930	League of Ireland XI	W	6–1	4–0	Dalymount Park	12000
24/09/1930	Football League XI	D	2–2	1–1	Windsor Park, Belfast	12000
08/10/1930	Scottish League XI	L	0–5	0–3	Firhill Park, Glasgow	10170
23/09/1931	Football League XI	L	0–4	0–2	Bloomfield Road, Blackpool	15233
03/10/1931	Scottish League XI	W	3–2	1–1	Windsor Park, Belfast	15000
01/10/1932	Football League XI	L	2–5	1–3	Windsor Park, Belfast	17000
19/10/1932	Scottish League XI	L	1–4	0–1	Ibrox Park, Glasgow	11000
30/09/1933	Scottish League XI	W	3–0	2–0	Windsor Park, Belfast	15357
04/10/1933	Football League XI	L	0–4	0–2	Deepdale, Preston	14400
19/09/1934	Football League XI	L	1–6	1–3	The Oval, Belfast	13500
03/10/1934	Scottish League XI	L	2–3	1–2	Firhill Park, Glasgow	8000
25/09/1935	Football League XI	W	2–1	1–1	Bloomfield Road, Blackpool	26000
23/10/1935	Scottish League XI	L	2–3	0–2	Windsor Park, Belfast	7000
02/09/1936	Scottish League XI	L	2–5	1–4	Ibrox Park, Glasgow	15000
23/09/1936	Football League XI	W	3–2	3–1	Windsor Park, Belfast	16000
01/09/1937	Scottish League XI	L	2–3	1–1	The Oval, Belfast	11082
06/10/1937	Football League XI	L	0–3	0–0	Bloomfield Road, Blackpool	14700
17/03/1938	League of Ireland XI	W	3–1	1–1	Dalymount Park, Dublin	30000
07/09/1938	Scottish League XI	L	1–6	0–5	Ibrox Park, Glasgow	26000
21/09/1938	Football League XI	L	2–8	1–2	Windsor Park, Belfast	14000
11/03/1939	League of Ireland XI	L	1–2	0–0	Windsor Park, Belfast	11000
30/08/1939	Scottish League XI	L	2–3	0–1	Windsor Park, Belfast	12000
18/03/1940	League of Ireland XI	L	0–2	0–1	Dalymount Park, Dublin	26000
17/03/1941	League of Ireland XI	W	8–3	3–2	Dalymount Park, Dublin	36000
14/04/1941	League of Ireland XI	W	2–1	2–1	Windsor Park, Belfast	25000
17/03/1942	League of Ireland XI	D	2–2	2–1	Dalymount Park, Dublin	31000
06/04/1942	League of Ireland XI	W	5–2	2–1	Windsor Park, Belfast	30000
17/03/1943	League of Ireland XI	W	1–0	0–0	Dalymount Park, Dublin	28000
26/04/1943	League of Ireland XI	D	2–2	2–1	Windsor Park, Belfast	21000
17/03/1944	League of Ireland XI	W	4–3	0–2	Dalymount Park, Dublin	28000
10/04/1944	League of Ireland XI	D	2–2	1–0	Windsor Park, Belfast	35000
17/03/1945	League of Ireland XI	L	1–2	0–2	Dalymount Park, Dublin	36000
02/04/1945	League of Ireland XI	L	3–5	1–2	Windsor Park, Belfast	32000
18/03/1946	League of Ireland XI	W	2–1	1–1	Dalymount Park, Dublin	37000
22/04/1946	League of Ireland XI	W	3–0	2–0	Windsor Park, Belfast	32000
19/02/1947	Football League XI	L	2–4	0–2	Goodison Park, Liverpool	36000
17/03/1947	League of Ireland XI	D	2–2	1–0	Dalymount Park, Dublin	20000
07/04/1947	League of Ireland XI	L	0–1	0–0	Windsor Park, Belfast	30000
30/04/1947	Scottish League XI	L	4–7	3–3	Windsor Park, Belfast	20000
22/10/1947	Football League XI	L	3–4	2–1	Windsor Park, Belfast	20000
14/01/1948	Scottish League XI	L	0–3	0–1	Celtic Park, Glasgow	50000
17/03/1948	League of Ireland XI	L	1–2	0–1	Dalymount Park, Dublin	25000
29/03/1948	League of Ireland XI	W	4–0	1–0	Windsor Park, Belfast	
20/09/1948	Football League XI	L	1–5	1–4	Anfield, Liverpool	27263
06/11/1948	Scottish League XI	L	0–1	0–1	Windsor Park, Belfast	30000
17/03/1949	League of Ireland XI	D	0–0	0–0	Dalymount Park, Dublin	20000
18/04/1949	League of Ireland XI	W	4–1	3–1	Windsor Park, Belfast	25000
07/09/1949	Scottish League XI	L	1–8	1–4	Ibrox Park, Glasgow	62000
17/03/1950	League of Ireland XI	L	1–3	1–0	Dalymount Park, Dublin	18000
10/04/1950	League of Ireland XI	D	2–2	1–2	Windsor Park, Belfast	10000
26/04/1950	Football League XI	L	1–3	1–1	Windsor Park, Belfast	20000
27/09/1950	Scottish League XI	L	0–2	0–4	Windsor Park, Belfast	15000
18/10/1950	Football League XI	L	3–6	2–3	Bloomfield Road, Blackpool	30000
26/03/1951	Western Command	W	4–2	?-?	Windsor Park, Belfast	
19/05/1951	Welsh League XI	L	0–2	0–0	Vetch Field, Swansea	
05/09/1951	Welsh League XI	L	3–7	1–4	Windsor Park, Belfast	15000
26/09/1951	Scottish League XI	L	0–3	0–1	Ibrox Park, Glasgow	23000
26/03/1952	Football League XI	L	0–9	0–2	Windsor Park, Belfast	20000
14/04/1952	Western Command	L	2–4	?-?	Windsor Park, Belfast	
03/09/1952	Scottish League XI	L	1–5	1–3	Windsor Park, Belfast	15000
24/09/1952	Football League XI	L	1–7	1–3	Molineux, Wolverhampton	15161
22/04/1953	League of Ireland XI	W	3–0	2–0	Dalymount Park, Dublin	16000
09/09/1953	Scottish League XI	L	0–4	0–3	Ibrox Park, Glasgow	25000
23/09/1953	Football League XI	L	0–5	0–3	Windsor Park, Belfast	23000
26/11/1953	Western Command	W	2–0	?-?	Grosvenor Park, Belfast	
19/04/1954	League of Ireland XI	D	0–0	0–0	Windsor Park, Belfast	12000
15/09/1954	Scottish League XI	L	1–5	1–1	Windsor Park, Belfast	15000
20/10/1954	Football League XI	L	2–4	0–2	Anfield, Liverpool	22323
10/11/1954	Western Command	L	2–3	?-?	Grosvenor Park, Belfast	
17/03/1955	League of Ireland XI	L	1–2	0–1	Dalymount Park, Dublin	30000
07/09/1955	Scottish League XI	L	0–3	0–0	Ibrox Park, Glasgow	33500
16/11/1955	Western Command	W	8–1	?-?	Grosvenor Park, Belfast	
17/03/1956	League of Ireland XI	L	0–1	0–0	Dalymount Park, Dublin	23000
02/04/1956	League of Ireland XI	W	6–0	2–0	Windsor Park, Belfast	20000
25/04/1956	Football League XI	W	5–2	2–1	Windsor Park, Belfast	20000
05/09/1956	Scottish League XI	L	1–7	1–2	The Oval, Belfast	25000
31/10/1956	Football League XI	L	2–3	0–2	St. Jame's Park, Newcastle	34000
21/11/1956	Western Command	W	3–1	?-?	Windsor Park, Belfast	
06/12/1956	Irish International XI	D	3–3	?-?	Windsor Park, Belfast	
18/03/1957	League of Ireland XI	D	2–2	0–1	Dalymount Park, Dublin	28000
22/04/1957	League of Ireland XI	L	1–2	1–1	Windsor Park, Belfast	15000
09/10/1957	Scottish League XI	L	0–7	0–1	Ibrox Park, Glasgow	30000
30/10/1957	Football League XI	L	2–4	2–2	Windsor Park, Belfast	18000
13/11/1957	Western Command	W	6–0	?-?	Windsor Park, Belfast	
17/03/1958	League of Ireland XI	D	2–2	1–2	Dalymount Park, Dublin	32000
07/04/1958	League of Ireland XI	W	3–1	1–1	Solitude, Belfast	29000
03/09/1958	Scottish League XI	L	0–5	0–3	Windsor Park, Belfast	7000
29/10/1958	League of Ireland XI	L	2–3	2–3	Windsor Park, Belfast	5000
12/11/1958	Football League XI	L	2–5	1–2	Anfield, Liverpool	30717
23/09/1959	Football League XI	L	0–5	0–1	Windsor Park, Belfast	18000
14/10/1959	Scottish League XI	L	1–7	0–4	Ibrox Park, Glasgow	23500
12/04/1960	League of Ireland XI	L	1–2	0–2	Tolka Park, Dublin	8000
07/09/1960	Scottish League XI	L	1–2	0–1	Windsor Park, Belfast	15000
12/10/1960	Football League XI	L	2–5	1–2	Bloomfield Road, Blackpool	19066
17/03/1961	League of Ireland XI	W	3–2	1–2	Dalymount Park, Dublin	12000
03/04/1961	League of Ireland XI	D	1–1	1–1	Solitude, Belfast	22000
04/10/1961	Scottish League XI	L	0–7	0–3	Ibrox Park, Glasgow	25000
01/11/1961	Football League XI	L	1–6	1–5	Windsor Park, Belfast	15000
20/03/1962	Italian Semi-Pro League XI	W	6–2	4–0	Windsor Park, Belfast	18000
04/04/1962	League of Ireland XI	W	3–1	1–0	Windsor Park, Belfast	4000
31/10/1962	Football League XI	L	1–3	0–2	Carrow Road, Norwich	15000
18/03/1963	League of Ireland XI	W	3–1	1–0	Dalymount Park, Dublin	15000
04/05/1963	Italian Semi-Pro League XI	L	0–1	0–0	Arezzo, Tuscany	10000
04/09/1963	Scottish League XI	L	1–4	0–1	Windsor Park, Belfast	15000
17/03/1964	League of Ireland XI	L	2–4	2–1	Dalymount Park, Dublin	8000
15/04/1964	League of Ireland XI	D	2–2	1–2	Windsor Park, Belfast	7000
28/10/1964	Football League XI	L	0–4	0–3	The Oval, Belfast	20000
14/05/1965	League of Ireland XI	W	1–0	0–0	Flower Lodge, Cork	3500
06/09/1965	Scottish League XI	L	2–6	1–3	Ibrox Stadium, Glasgow	11500
21/09/1966	Football League XI	L	0–12	0–6	Home Park, Plymouth	35458
22/03/1967	League of Ireland XI	W	3–1	2–0	Windsor Park, Belfast	6000
06/09/1967	Scottish League XI	L	0–2	0–0	Windsor Park, Belfast	10000
25/10/1967	League of Ireland XI	L	2–3	0–3	Dalymount Park, Dublin	10000
27/11/1968	Football League XI	L	0–1	0–1	Windsor Park, Belfast	12000
09/04/1969	League of Ireland XI	L	1–2	0–1	Windsor Park, Belfast	5000
19/11/1969	Scottish League XI	L	2–5	0–3	Ibrox Park, Glasgow	4000
17/03/1970	League of Ireland XI	W	2–0	0–0	Dalymount Park, Dublin	10000
23/09/1970	Football League XI	L	0–5	0–2	Carrow Road, Norwich	20743
18/03/1974	League of Ireland XI	L	2–3	1–2	Dalymount Park, Dublin	2000
01/11/1978	Scottish League XI	D	1–1	1–0	Fir Park, Motherwell	4427
12/03/1980	Glentoran	W	2–1		The Oval, Belfast	
18/03/1980	Scottish League XI	L	2–4	1–1	Windsor Park, Belfast	1800
20/09/1980	Canada	W	3–1	0–0	King George V Park, St. John's, Newfoundland and Labrador	3000
24/09/1980	Canada	L	1–2	2–1	Varsity Stadium, Toronto	3689
15/04/1981	League of Ireland XI	L	0–1	0–1	Tolka Park, Dublin	1000
16/02/1982	OFK Belgrade *	D	3–3	2–2	Windsor Park, Belfast	1800
30/10/1984	League of Ireland XI	W	4–0	1–0	Windsor Park, Belfast	873
17/03/1986	League of Ireland XI	L	1–2	0–0	Tolka Park, Dublin	1500
17/03/1987	League of Ireland XI	W	2–1	2–1	The Showgrounds, Newry	700
10/08/1987	Manchester United	D	0–0	0–0	Windsor Park, Belfast	8000
09/09/1987	Football League XI	D	2–2	2–1	Windsor Park, Belfast	3978
16/03/1989	Hibernian	L	1–2	1–1	Easter Road, Edinburgh	3000
17/05/1989	League of Ireland XI	L	0–3	0–1	Oriel Park, Dundalk	500
06/07/1989	Fort Lauderdale Strikers	L	2–5	0–3	Lockhart Stadium, Fort Lauderdale, Florida	2071
09/07/1989	Penn-Jersey Spirit	D	1–1	0–1	Trenton State College, New Jersey	2239
13/07/1989	Ruch Chorzów	W	1–0	0–0	Veterans Memorial Stadium, New Britain, Connecticut	2532
15/07/1989	United States	L	0–1	0–1	Veterans Memorial Stadium, New Britain, Connecticut	2011
07/05/1990	League of Ireland XI	L	0–1	0–1	The Oval, Belfast	500
11/08/1990	Manchester United	L	0–3	0–0	Windsor Park, Belfast	12000
13/11/1990	Football League XI	D	1–1	1–0	Windsor Park, Belfast	3600
03/04/1991	Kilmarnock	L	1–2	0–0	Rugby Park, Kilmarnock	4000
19/11/1991	League of Ireland XI	W	2–0	1–0	Tolka Park, Dublin	2000
04/08/1992	Everton	L	0–1	0–0	The Oval, Belfast	1252
07/03/1995	League of Ireland XI	D	1–1	1–0	Richmond Park, Dublin	600
01/11/2000	League of Ireland XI	W	2–0	1–0	Terryland Park, Galway	350
13/02/2007	Football Conference XI **	W	3–1	2–0	Mourneview Park, Lurgan	1600
15/05/2012	Manchester United	L	1–4	0–1	Windsor Park, Belfast	14098

== Notes ==
- * Also billed as Yugoslavian League XI
- ** Also billed as England National Game XI
