= Newry City F.C. =

Newry City
- Full name: Newry City Football Club
- Founded: 1918 (as Newry Town)
- Dissolved: 2012
- Ground: The Showgrounds, Newry
Home colours	Away colours

Newry City Football Club was a Northern Irish football club founded in 1918 and dissolved in 2012. It was based in Newry, County Down and played its home matches at the Showgrounds. Club colours were blue and white. The club was relegated from the IFA Premiership in the 2010–11 season, and after narrowly missing out on promotion back to the top tier the following season, was dissolved in September 2012, when a winding up petition brought against the club by former player and manager Gerry Flynn was granted, and the club decided not to appeal the decision.

The formation of a new club called Newry City AFC was finalised in March 2013, with the club starting life in the Mid-Ulster Football League for the 2013–14 season, reaching the NIFL Championship for the 2017–18 season.

== History ==
The club was originally known as Newry Town – it was renamed in 2004, two years after Newry obtained city status.

The club was formed in the autumn of 1918 and played its first season in the Newry and District League, winning its first trophy in May 1919 by beating Damolly Rovers in the final of the Newell Cup. The following season, Newry finished second in the league and joined the 'more competitive and higher standard' Portadown and District League in 1921. In 1923, the club applied to join the Irish League and on 20 July 1923 the club was admitted on a unanimous vote, thus acquiring senior status.

The club played originally at the Marshes until the 1946–47 season, when a factory was built on the site and the club was compensated with £5,000. The club used this money to develop a new ground – the Showgrounds – adjacent to the Marshes, which opened at the start of the 1948–49 season.

The Irish League was suspended because of the Second World War in 1940, and Newry was not included in the temporary Northern Regional League that took its place. When the Irish League resumed in 1947, it was with twelve rather than fourteen members, Newry and Larne losing their places. Newry played instead in the Irish Intermediate League until 1954, when the league folded due to the loss of members to the Irish League B Division. Newry, along with Dundela and Carrick Rangers failed to be accepted as B Division members and instead joined the Irish Alliance League. Newry were Alliance champions for the following three seasons, before eventually securing admission to the B Division in 1957.

In 1957–58, the Intermediate Cup was won for the first time, a feat repeated in 1966–67, and the B Division championship in 1959–60. In 1963, Pat Jennings was sold to Watford for £5,600. Newry won the Southern section of the B Division in 1974–75, but lost to Carrick Rangers in the championship play-off. A "double" was achieved in 1980–81, when Town won the B Division and the Intermediate Cup.

On the back of this success, the club applied to join the Irish League in 1981, but was initially turned down. In 1983, however, the League decided to extend its membership to fourteen clubs and Newry, along with Carrick Rangers, were admitted to membership, restoring senior status for the first time in some forty years.

The club's most successful period was the late 1990s. After winning the First Division in the 1997–98 season, the club managed to finish fourth in the Premier Division, thus qualifying for the Intertoto Cup. In this, their first ever appearance in European competition, Newry Town (as they were then known) were drawn against the Croatian side Hrvatski Dragovoljac. A 1–0 defeat in Croatia was followed by an historic 2–0 win at home to send the club into the second round. There they met Bundesliga side MSV Duisburg. Again, Newry were drawn away in the first leg, coming away with a respectable 2–0 defeat to the German professionals. A 1–0 win at home was not enough to force extra time but the side had exceeded expectations in the tournament.

Since the 1999–2000 season, the club went into decline, culminating in a last-place finish in the league in 2002–03. However, thanks to the restructuring of the Irish Football League they were given the chance to avoid relegation, with a play-off against Bangor over two legs. A 0–0 away draw and a 2–1 home win kept the club in the top flight.

In the 2006–07 season, big things were expected of Roy Coyle's team, with the manager seen as the most successful manager in the history of the Irish league, however poor results resulted in Coyle leaving the club. He was replaced by former player Gerry Flynn at the start of 2007. In the 2007–08 season, Flynn's first full season in charge, he and his assistant Peter Murray steered the club to 8th position in the final league table. In September 2009, after a 2–1 victory over Coleraine, Flynn resigned.

Shortly after, former Newry player-manager John McDonnell was given the job. On 13 March 2010, after an uncharacteristically unsuccessful spell McDonnell resigned as First team manager and Gerry Flynn once again took the reins. On 26 April 2011, the club lost 4–0 to Glenavon and were relegated to IFA Championship 1. Prior to this, Gerry Flynn was sacked as manager and former club captain Robbie Casey took charge on a temporary basis. Despite speculation that Roddy Collins was to get the job, former Manchester United player Pat McGibbon later took over as first team coach.

Under McGibbon's leadership Newry were unlucky not to achieve promotion after only one season in the IFA Championship. The club finished as runners-up in the league behind Ballinamallard United and lost the two-legged promotion play-off 3–2 on aggregate to Lisburn Distillery. The club also reached the semi-finals of the Irish Cup, being beaten 7–0 by eventual winners Linfield. In July 2012, McGibbon stepped down from his post as first team coach, citing personal reasons for doing so.

== Dissolution ==
In early 2012, former manager Gerry Flynn took legal action against the club for wrongful dismissal and breach of contract regarding his sacking in 2011. The court found in his favour and ordered the club to pay Flynn £25,050 in damages. However, on 10 August 2012, the club (Newry City FC Ltd) was the subject of a winding up petition brought by Flynn, after he had not received settlement. As a result, the IFA postponed the club's opening fixture of the 2012–13 IFA Championship season, but after the club gave assurances to the IFA, the governing body allowed Newry to fulfil the upcoming fixtures. However, on 21 September 2012, the winding up petition was granted at a High Court hearing. The IFA then suspended the club's membership, preventing any team affiliated with the club from playing any fixtures. Ultimately, the club decided not to appeal against the ruling, which meant dissolution after 89 years of existence. This left the IFA with no option but to terminate the club's membership immediately, expunging all of its results from the season so far.

Many of the former players left to join neighbouring club Warrenpoint Town F.C. With the backing of the dissolved club's fans, the formation of a new phoenix club called Newry City AFC with similar colours and badges, but with no legal or corporate link, to the former side was finalised in March 2013, with the new club starting life in the Mid-Ulster Football League for the 2013–14 season, reaching the NIFL Championship for the 2017–18 season.

== European record ==
Season	Competition	Round	Opponent	Home	Away	Aggregate
1999	UEFA Intertoto Cup	1R	(Croatia) Hrvatski Dragovoljac	2–0	0–1	2–1
1999	UEFA Intertoto Cup	2R	(Germany) Duisburg	1–0	0–2	1–2

== Honours ==
=== Senior honours ===
- Irish League First Division (Tier 2): 1
  - 1997–98
- County Antrim Shield: 1
  - 1987–88
- Mid-Ulster Cup: 15
  - 1936–37, 1938–39, 1956–57, 1963–64, 1966–67, 1968–69, 1974–75, 1977–78, 1978–79, 1984–85, 1986–87, 1989–90, 1999–00, 2006–07, 2011–12

=== Intermediate honours ===
- Irish League B Division: 2
  - 1959–60, 1980–81
- Irish Intermediate Cup: 4
  - 1957–58, 1966–67, 1980–81, 2011–12
- Irish Alliance: 3
  - 1954–55, 1955–56, 1956–57
- Bob Radcliffe Cup: 2
  - 1978–79, 1984–85†

† Won by reserve team

== Notable former players ==
- (Northern Ireland) Pat Jennings (goalkeeper)
- (Republic of Ireland) Tommy Breen
- (Republic of Ireland) Jimmy Kelly
- (Republic of Ireland) John Feenan
- (Northern Ireland) Mickey Keenan (goalkeeper coach)
- (Northern Ireland) Mickey Collins (midfielder)
- (Northern Ireland) Davy O'Hare (goalkeeper)
- (Republic of Ireland) John Connolly (goalkeeper)
