= List of association football stadiums in Northern Ireland =

The following is a list of football stadiums in Northern Ireland, ranked in order of capacity, with the minimum capacity being 1,000.

== Current stadiums ==
#	Image	Stadium	Capacity	City	Home team(s)
1		Windsor Park	18,434	Belfast	Linfield, Northern Ireland national team
2		The Showgrounds	6,500	Coleraine	Coleraine, Limavady United
3		The Showgrounds	6,500	Newry	Newry City A.F.C.
4		Brandywell Stadium	6,242	Derry	Derry City, Institute
5		The Oval	6,050	Belfast	Glentoran
6		Solitude	6,000	Belfast	Cliftonville, Newington
7		Dixon Park	5,333	Ballyclare	Ballyclare Comrades
8		Mourneview Park	5,000	Lurgan	Glenavon
9		Donegal Celtic Park	4,200	Belfast	Donegal Celtic
10		Ballymena Showgrounds	4,100	Ballymena	Ballymena United
11		Seaview	3,383	Belfast	Crusaders
12		Holm Park	3,300	Armagh	Armagh City
13		YMCA Grounds	3,000	Drumahoe	Institute
14		Stangmore Park	3,000	Dungannon	Dungannon Swifts
15		The Bangor Fuels Arena	2,850	Bangor	Bangor, Ards
16		Shamrock Park	2,770	Portadown	Portadown
17		Inver Park	2,732	Larne	Larne
18		Wilgar Park	2,500	Belfast	Dundela
19		Taylors Avenue	2,100	Carrickfergus	Carrick Rangers
20		Allen Park	2,000	Antrim	Chimney Corner, Wakehurst
21		Blanchflower Park	2,000	Belfast	Harland & Wolff Welders
22		Ferney Park	2,000	Ballinamallard	Ballinamallard United
23		Hagan Park	2,000	Coagh	Coagh United
24		Mill Meadow	2,000	Castledawson	Moyola Park
25		Milltown Park	2,000	Warrenpoint	Warrenpoint
26		Riada Stadium	2,000	Ballymoney	Ballymoney United, Glebe Rangers
27		Lakeview Park	1,650	Loughgall	Loughgall
28		Knockrammer Park	1,600	Lurgan	Oxford Sunnyside, Lurgan Celtic
29		Crystal Park	1,500	Banbridge	Banbridge Town
30		The Dub	1,500	Belfast	Queens University, PSNI
31		Fortwilliam Park	1,500	Tobermore	Tobermore United
32		New Grosvenor Stadium	1,500	Ballyskeagh	Lisburn Distillery
33		The Showgrounds	1,500	Limavady	Limavady United, Strabane Athletic
34		Tandragee Road	1,250	Portadown	Annagh United
35		Crewe Park	1,250	Glenavy	Crewe United
36		Darragh Park	1,200	Castlederg	Dergview
37		Iveagh Park	1,000	Rathfriland	Rathfriland Rangers
38		Mid Ulster Sports Arena	1,000	Cookstown	Killymoon Rangers
39		Planters Park	1,000	Lurgan	Dollingstown

== See also ==
- List of football stadiums in Ireland
- List of football stadiums in England
- List of football stadiums in Scotland
- List of football stadiums in Wales
- List of stadiums in the United Kingdom by capacity
- List of stadiums in Ireland by capacity
- List of Gaelic Athletic Association stadiums
- List of European stadiums by capacity
- List of association football stadiums by capacity
- Lists of stadiums
