= 2024–25 NIFL Championship =

NIFL Championship
- Season: 2024–25
- Champions: Bangor
- Promoted: Bangor
- Relegated: Ballyclare Comrades; Newry City

The 2024–25 NIFL Championship (known as the Playr-Fit Championship for sponsorship reasons) was the eighth season of the NIFL Championship (the second-tier of the Irish League - the national football league in Northern Ireland) since gaining senior status.

== Teams ==
The league consisted of twelve teams; nine teams remaining from the previous season, two teams promoted from the NIFL Premier Intermediate League, and one team relegated from the NIFL Premiership.

The promoted teams were 2023–24 NIFL Premier Intermediate League champions Limavady United and 2023–24 NIFL Championship play-off winners Armagh City. They replaced the NIFL Championship play-off losers Dergview and bottom-placed team Knockbreda.

The relegated team was the 2023–24 NIFL Premiership bottom-placed team Newry City. They replaced the 2023–24 NIFL Championship champions Portadown.

Locations of the 2024–25 NIFL Championship teams
Locations of the Belfast-based 2024–25 NIFL Championship teams

=== Stadia and locations ===
Club	Stadium	Location	Capacity
Annagh United	BMG Arena	Portadown	1,250 (100 seated)
Ards	Clandeboye Park	Bangor	1,895 (500 seated)
Armagh City	Holm Park	Armagh	2,000 (500 seated)
Ballinamallard United	Ferney Park	Ballinamallard	2,000 (250 seated)
Ballyclare Comrades	Dixon Park	Ballyclare	2,398 (538 Seated)
Bangor	Clandeboye Park	Bangor	1,895 (500 seated)
Dundela	Wilgar Park	Belfast	2,500
Harland & Wolff Welders	Blanchflower Stadium	Belfast	3,000 (2,000 seated)
Institute	Ryan McBride Brandywell Stadium	Derry	3,700
Limavady United	The Showgrounds	Limavady	524 (274 seated)
Newington	Inver Park	Larne	3,000
Newry City	The Showgrounds	Newry	2,275 (1,080 seated)

== Regular season ==
=== League table ===
Pos	Team	Pld	W	D	L	GF	GA	GD	Pts	Qualification
1	Bangor	33	21	5	7	72	38	+34	68	Qualification for Section A
2	Harland & Wolff Welders	33	18	6	9	68	42	+26	60	Qualification for Section A
3	Limavady United	33	17	9	7	60	36	+24	60	Qualification for Section A
4	Annagh United	33	17	5	11	58	33	+25	56	Qualification for Section A
5	Ards	33	14	8	11	50	47	+3	50	Qualification for Section A
6	Dundela	33	14	6	13	54	54	0	48	Qualification for Section A
7	Institute	33	10	11	12	50	54	−4	41	Qualification for Section B
8	Armagh City	33	9	11	13	51	66	−15	38	Qualification for Section B
9	Ballinamallard United	33	11	4	18	49	55	−6	37	Qualification for Section B
10	Ballyclare Comrades	33	10	5	18	42	74	−32	35	Qualification for Section B
11	Newington	33	8	7	18	36	63	−27	31	Qualification for Section B
12	Newry City	33	6	9	18	38	66	−28	27	Qualification for Section B

Source: NIFL Championship
Rules for classification: 1) Points; 2) Goal difference; 3) Number of goals scored; 4) Head-to-head points; 5) Head-to-head goal difference; 6) Drawing of lots

=== Results ===
For matches 1–22, each team plays every other team twice (home and away). For matches 23–33, each team plays every other team for the third time (either at home or away).

Home \ Away	ANN	ARD	ARM	BMD	BCC	BAG	DUN	HAR	INS	LIM	NEW	NEC	ANN	ARD	ARM	BMD	BCC	BAG	DUN	HAR	INS	LIM	NEW	NEC
Annagh United	—	0–1	1–2	1–0	5–0	1–0	0–0	2–0	2–1	1–1	2–0	1–0	—	—	—	1–0	1–2	4–3	—	—	—	2–2	—	4–0
Ards	1–1	—	3–1	0–1	1–3	0–4	0–1	3–1	0–0	2–0	3–2	0–1	2–0	—	4–2	—	3–1	0–0	1–3	—	—	—	1–1	—
Armagh City	3–1	4–1	—	3–2	1–2	1–4	3–4	3–0	2–2	2–2	0–1	3–3	0–6	—	—	—	—	0–3	—	3–3	1–2	1–1	—	—
Ballinamallard United	0–3	2–2	1–3	—	4–0	4–0	1–2	0–1	1–2	1–2	4–1	2–1	—	2–2	2–0	—	2–0	—	3–1	—	—	—	3–2	1–1
Ballyclare Comrades	2–1	3–2	1–1	1–4	—	2–3	0–3	2–7	3–3	0–4	1–1	3–1	—	—	0–3	—	—	—	1–1	—	2–2	0–2	—	3–1
Bangor	2–1	0–0	1–1	3–2	1–0	—	3–1	2–2	3–1	1–3	3–0	3–0	—	—	—	4–0	4–0	—	—	1–4	—	1–0	4–1	—
Dundela	2–0	1–0	0–1	3–3	2–1	1–3	—	1–2	4–3	2–3	3–1	1–0	0–1	—	4–2	—	—	0–2	—	1–2	1–3	—	1–3	—
Harland & Wolff Welders	2–1	4–0	5–0	4–0	0–2	0–1	1–3	—	3–1	0–5	1–0	2–1	3–0	0–1	—	4–0	3–1	—	—	—	—	—	—	4–1
Institute	0–0	2–4	0–0	2–1	1–3	3–1	2–2	1–3	—	1–1	4–0	2–0	2–6	2–3	—	1–0	—	0–0	—	1–1	—	—	—	1–1
Limavady United	2–1	0–3	3–0	1–2	0–1	0–3	3–2	0–0	2–1	—	4–1	3–0	—	0–1	—	2–1	—	—	4–0	0–0	2–1	—	—	3–1
Newington	0–3	2–2	0–0	1–0	2–0	0–2	1–1	1–4	0–1	0–0	—	3–3	0–3	—	2–3	—	3–1	—	—	2–0	2–0	1–2	—	—
Newry City	0–2	1–4	1–1	1–0	2–1	4–5	0–2	2–2	0–2	3–3	3–1	—	—	2–0	1–1	—	—	2–1	1–1	—	—	—	0–1	—

Source: NIFL Championship
Legend: Blue = home team win; Yellow = draw; Red = away team win.
For upcoming matches, an "a" indicates there is an article about the rivalry between the two participants.

== Matches 34–38 ==
For the final five matches, the table splits into two halves, with the top six teams forming Section A and the bottom six teams forming Section B. Each team plays every other team in their respective section once. The fixtures are reversed from those played during rounds 23–33, ensuring that teams have played every other team in their respective section twice at home and twice away overall throughout the season.

=== Section A ===
==== League table ====
Pos	Team	Pld	W	D	L	GF	GA	GD	Pts	Promotion or qualification
1	Bangor (C, P)	38	23	7	8	82	46	+36	76	Promotion to the NIFL Premiership
2	Annagh United	38	22	5	11	70	37	+33	71	Qualification for the NIFL Premiership play-off
3	Harland & Wolff Welders	38	20	6	12	79	53	+26	66	
4	Limavady United	38	18	12	8	67	44	+23	66	
5	Ards	38	14	10	14	55	57	−2	52	
6	Dundela	38	15	7	16	58	62	−4	52	

Source: NIFL Championship
Rules for classification: 1) Points; 2) Goal difference; 3) Number of goals scored; 4) Head-to-head points; 5) Head-to-head goal difference; 6) Drawing of lots
(C) Champions; (P) Promoted

==== Results ====
Each team plays each other once (either at home or away).

Home \ Away	ANN	ARD	BAG	DUN	HAR	LIM
Annagh United	—	1–0	—	2–0	4–2	—
Ards	—	—	—	—	2–5	1–1
Bangor	2–3	2–2	—	3–1	—	—
Dundela	—	1–0	—	—	—	1–1
Harland & Wolff Welders	—	—	0–1	2–1	—	2–3
Limavady United	0–2	—	2–2	—	—	—

Source: NIFL Championship
Legend: Blue = home team win; Yellow = draw; Red = away team win.
For upcoming matches, an "a" indicates there is an article about the rivalry between the two participants.

=== Section B ===
==== League table ====
Pos	Team	Pld	W	D	L	GF	GA	GD	Pts	Qualification or relegation
7	Institute	38	13	12	13	62	63	−1	51	
8	Ballinamallard United	38	13	5	20	55	62	−7	44	
9	Armagh City	38	10	12	16	62	78	−16	42	
10	Newington	38	11	9	18	51	74	−23	42	
11	Ballyclare Comrades (R)	38	11	7	20	52	85	−33	40	Qualification for the NIFL Championship play-off
12	Newry City (R)	38	7	10	21	46	78	−32	31	Relegation to the NIFL Premier Intermediate League

Source: NIFL Championship
Rules for classification: 1) Points; 2) Goal difference; 3) Number of goals scored; 4) Head-to-head points; 5) Head-to-head goal difference; 6) Drawing of lots
(R) Relegated

==== Results ====
Each team plays each other once (either at home or away).

Home \ Away	ARM	BMD	BCC	INS	NEW	NEC
Armagh City	—	0–1	1–2	—	3–3	4–1
Ballinamallard United	—	—	—	2–0	—	—
Ballyclare Comrades	—	2–2	—	—	2–4	—
Institute	4–3	—	2–1	—	3–3	—
Newington	—	2–1	—	—	—	3–2
Newry City	—	3–0	2–2	0–3	—	—

Source: NIFL Championship
Legend: Blue = home team win; Yellow = draw; Red = away team win.
For upcoming matches, an "a" indicates there is an article about the rivalry between the two participants.

== NIFL Championship play-off ==
The eleventh-placed club (Ballyclare Comrades) faced the second-placed club from the 2024–25 NIFL Premier Intermediate League (Queen's University) in a two-legged play-off for the final place in the 2025–26 NIFL Championship.

=== First leg ===
6 May 2025	Queen's University	3–0	Ballyclare Comrades	Belfast
19:15	Ovens 35'; McKenna 59'; Sheridan 87'			Stadium: Upper Malone

=== Second leg ===
9 May 2025	Ballyclare Comrades	2–0 (2–3 agg.)	Queen's University	Ballyclare
19:45	Hawthorne 7'; Doyle 55'			Stadium: Dixon Park
