= 2026–27 NIFL Championship =

NIFL Championship
- Season: 2026–27
- Dates: 8 August 2026 – 24 April 2027
- Matches: 134
- Goals: 408 (3.04 per match)
- Top goalscorer: Ryan Waide (22 goals)
- Biggest home win: Institute 7–0 Newington (3 October 2026)
- Biggest away win: Armagh City 0–6 Newington (7 November 2026)
- Highest scoring: Newington 5–5 Dundela (12 September 2026)
- All statistics correct as of 21 November 2026.

The 2026–27 NIFL Championship (known as the Boyle Sports Championship for sponsorship reasons) is the tenth season of the NIFL Championship (the second-tier of the Irish League, the national football league in Northern Ireland) since gaining senior status. This is the first season with a new expanded format featuring 16 teams.

== Teams ==
Locations of the 2026–27 NIFL Championship teams
Locations of the Belfast-based 2026–27 NIFL Championship teams

The league consists of sixteen teams; eleven teams remaining from the previous season, four teams promoted from the NIFL Premier Intermediate League, and one team relegated from the NIFL Premiership. Because of the league's expansion, no team was relegated after the previous season.

The promoted teams from the 2025–26 NIFL Premier Intermediate League were the champions Moyola Park, as well as Strabane Athletic, Rathfriland Rangers, and Newry City.

The relegated team was the 2025–26 NIFL Premiership bottom-placed team Glenavon. They replaced the 2025–26 NIFL Championship champions Limavady United.

=== Stadia and locations ===
| Club | Stadium | Location | Capacity |
|---|---|---|---|
| Annagh United | BMG Arena | Portadown | 1,250 (100 seated) |
| Ards | Clandeboye Park | Bangor | 2,000 (500 seated) |
| Armagh City | Holm Park | Armagh | 2,000 (500 seated) |
| Ballinamallard United | Ferney Park | Ballinamallard | 2,000 (250 seated) |
| Dundela | Wilgar Park | Belfast | 2,500 |
| Glenavon | Mourneview Park | Lurgan | 3,302 (all seated) |
| Harland & Wolff Welders | Blanchflower Stadium | Belfast | 2,000 |
| Institute | Ryan McBride Brandywell Stadium | Derry | 3,700 |
| Loughgall | Lakeview Park | Loughgall | 1,300 (800 seated) |
| Moyola Park | Mill Meadow | Castledawson | 2,000 (200 seated) |
| Newington | Solitude | Belfast | 3,054 |
| Newry City | Newry Showgrounds | Newry | 2,809 (831 seated) |
| Queen's University | Blanchflower Stadium | Belfast | 2,000 |
| Rathfriland Rangers | Iveagh Park | Rathfriland | 1,000 |
| Strabane Athletic | Limavady Showgrounds | Limavady | 1,500 (274 seated) |
| Warrenpoint Town | Milltown | Warrenpoint | 1,450 |

== Regular season ==
=== League table ===
| Pos | Team | Pld | W | D | L | GF | GA | GD | Pts | Qualification |
|---|---|---|---|---|---|---|---|---|---|---|
| 1 | Glenavon | 17 | 12 | 3 | 2 | 46 | 17 | +29 | 39 | Qualification for Section A |
| 2 | Annagh United | 17 | 11 | 4 | 2 | 41 | 19 | +22 | 37 | Qualification for Section A |
| 3 | Newington | 17 | 11 | 3 | 3 | 39 | 23 | +16 | 36 | Qualification for Section A |
| 4 | Queen's University | 17 | 8 | 2 | 7 | 32 | 22 | +10 | 26 | Qualification for Section A |
| 5 | Newry City | 17 | 7 | 5 | 5 | 26 | 25 | +1 | 26 | Qualification for Section A |
| 6 | Institute | 16 | 7 | 3 | 6 | 28 | 21 | +7 | 24 | Qualification for Section A |
| 7 | Warrenpoint Town | 16 | 6 | 4 | 6 | 24 | 25 | −1 | 22 | Qualification for Section A |
| 8 | Ballinamallard United | 17 | 6 | 4 | 7 | 21 | 23 | −2 | 22 | Qualification for Section A |
| 9 | Harland & Wolff Welders | 17 | 7 | 1 | 9 | 24 | 27 | −3 | 22 | Qualification for Section B |
| 10 | Loughgall | 17 | 5 | 6 | 6 | 22 | 32 | −10 | 21 | Qualification for Section B |
| 11 | Ards | 17 | 5 | 5 | 7 | 17 | 21 | −4 | 20 | Qualification for Section B |
| 12 | Rathfriland Rangers | 17 | 6 | 1 | 10 | 18 | 29 | −11 | 19 | Qualification for Section B |
| 13 | Moyola Park | 17 | 5 | 3 | 9 | 19 | 32 | −13 | 18 | Qualification for Section B |
| 14 | Dundela | 15 | 4 | 5 | 6 | 24 | 28 | −4 | 17 | Qualification for Section B |
| 15 | Armagh City | 17 | 2 | 6 | 9 | 14 | 33 | −19 | 12 | Qualification for Section B |
| 16 | Strabane Athletic | 17 | 2 | 5 | 10 | 13 | 31 | −18 | 11 | Qualification for Section B |

Updated to match(es) played on 21 November 2026. Source: NIFL Championship
Rules for classification: 1) Points; 2) Goal difference; 3) Number of goals scored; 4) Head-to-head points; 5) Head-to-head goal difference; 6) Drawing of lots

=== Results ===
For matches 1–30, each team plays every other team twice (home and away).

| Home \ Away | ANN | ARD | ARM | BMD | DUN | GLE | HWW | INS | LOU | MOY | NWT | NWR | QUE | RAT | STR | WAR |
|---|---|---|---|---|---|---|---|---|---|---|---|---|---|---|---|---|
| Annagh United | — | 2–1 | | 3–1 | | 1–1 | 3–1 | 5–0 | | 2–0 | | | 5–1 | 4–2 | | |
| Ards | | — | | | 2–2 | | | 0–2 | 1–2 | 1–0 | 0–1 | 1–1 | 0–3 | 1–0 | 0–1 | |
| Armagh City | 1–3 | 1–1 | — | | 0–2 | 2–2 | | 3–5 | | | 0–6 | | 1–1 | 2–0 | | |
| Ballinamallard United | 1–3 | 1–1 | 0–1 | — | 2–1 | 1–1 | | | 0–0 | | | 0–1 | | 0–1 | | 2–2 |
| Dundela | 2–2 | | | | — | 3–2 | | | 0–3 | 2–2 | | | 0–2 | 0–1 | 1–1 | |
| Glenavon | | 1–3 | | | | — | 4–0 | 2–0 | 4–1 | | 1–0 | 1–0 | | 3–1 | 4–1 | |
| Harland & Wolff Welders | 2–1 | 3–0 | 1–0 | 1–3 | 2–0 | | — | | 1–2 | | | | | 1–3 | | 3–0 |
| Institute | | | 5–0 | 1–2 | | | 0–0 | — | 0–0 | 1–1 | 7–0 | 1–3 | | | | 2–0 |
| Loughgall | 0–3 | | 0–0 | 1–6 | | 1–6 | | | — | 1–2 | 2–2 | 2–1 | | | | 3–3 |
| Moyola Park | | 0–0 | 1–0 | 2–0 | | 0–3 | 1–4 | | | — | 2–3 | 1–2 | 1–3 | | 1–3 | |
| Newington | 4–1 | 0–2 | | 4–0 | 5–5 | | 2–0 | | | | — | | 2–1 | 4–0 | | 1–1 |
| Newry City | 1–1 | | 2–2 | | 3–1 | 1–4 | 3–2 | | | | 0–2 | — | | | 3–0 | 0–3 |
| Queen's University | | | | 0–1 | 1–2 | 2–4 | 2–1 | 4–1 | 1–0 | 0–1 | | 1–1 | — | | 6–0 | |
| Rathfriland Rangers | | | 2–1 | | | | 2–0 | 0–2 | 1–3 | 1–2 | | 1–2 | 1–0 | — | 2–2 | 0–2 |
| Strabane Athletic | 0–1 | | 0–0 | 0–1 | 0–3 | | 1–2 | 0–1 | 1–1 | | 1–2 | 2–2 | | | — | |
| Warrenpoint Town | 1–1 | 1–3 | 2–0 | | | 0–3 | | 1–0 | | 6–2 | 0–1 | | 1–4 | | 1–0 | — |

Updated to match(es) played on 21 November 2026. Source: NIFL Championship
Legend: Blue = home team win; Yellow = draw; Red = away team win.
For upcoming matches, an "a" indicates there is an article about the rivalry between the two participants.

== Matches 31–37 ==
For the final seven matches, the table splits into two halves, with the top eight teams forming Section A and the bottom eight teams forming Section B. Each team plays every other team in their respective section once.

The winners of Section A are the champions, and they get promoted to the 2026–27 NIFL Premiership, while the runners-up go into a two-legged play-off against the second-bottom team in the Premiership for another place in the Premiership. The bottom club in Section B gets relegated, while the team in the 15th position will face a play-off against the runner-up in the National Conference League Premier (a revamped third tier of the Northern Irish football that replaced the NIFL Premier Intermediate League).
