= 2023–24 NIFL Premier Intermediate League =

NIFL Premier Intermediate League
- Season: 2023–24
- Dates: 26 Aug 2023 – 27 Apr 2024
- Champions: Limavady United
- Promoted: Limavady United; Armagh City
- Relegated: PSNI

The 2023–24 NIFL Premier Intermediate League (known as the Playr-Fit Premier Intermediate League for sponsorship reasons) was the seventh season of the NIFL Premier Intermediate League (the third tier of the Northern Ireland Football League - the national football league in Northern Ireland). The season began on 26 August 2023 and concluded on 27 April 2024.

The winners (Limavady United) were promoted to the 2024–25 NIFL Championship. The runners-up (Armagh City) were also promoted after winning the NIFL Championship play-off. The bottom-placed team (PSNI) were relegated to Level 4.

== Teams ==
The league consisted of fourteen teams; eleven teams remaining from the previous season, two teams promoted from Level 4, and one team relegated from the NIFL Championship. The two promoted teams were Coagh United (champions of the 2022–23 Ballymena & Provincial Football League) and Rathfriland Rangers (champions of the 2022–23 Northern Amateur Football League), increasing the number of teams by two. The relegated team was Warrenpoint Town, who were relegated from the 2022–23 NIFL Championship due to a licensing issue (replacing the promoted team of Bangor).

Locations of the 2023–24 NIFL Premier Intermediate teams

Club	Stadium	Location	Capacity
Armagh City	Holm Park	Armagh	2,000
Ballymacash Rangers	The Bluebell Stadium	Lisburn	1,280
Banbridge Town	Crystal Park	Banbridge	1,500
Coagh United	Hagan Park	Coagh	1,000 (150 seated)
Dollingstown	Planter's Park	Dollingstown	1,000
Limavady United	The Showgrounds	Limavady	1,500 (274 seated)
Lisburn Distillery	New Grosvenor Stadium	Ballyskeagh	7,000 (540 seated)
Moyola Park	Mill Meadow	Castledawson	1,000
Portstewart	Mullaghacall	Portstewart	1,000
PSNI	The Dub	Belfast	1,000 (330 seated)
Queen's University	Upper Malone	Belfast	1,000 (330 seated)
Rathfriland Rangers	Iveagh Park	Rathfriland	
Tobermore United	Fortwilliam Park	Tobermore	2,000 (100 seated)
Warrenpoint Town	Milltown	Warrenpoint	1,450

== League table ==
Pos	Team	Pld	W	D	L	GF	GA	GD	Pts	Promotion, qualification or relegation
1	Limavady United (C, P)	26	18	4	4	71	31	+40	58	Promotion to NIFL Championship
2	Armagh City (O, P)	26	15	7	4	55	36	+19	52	Qualification for the NIFL Championship play-off
3	Ballymacash Rangers	26	15	4	7	58	36	+22	49	
4	Rathfriland Rangers	26	14	4	8	47	26	+21	46	
5	Queen's University	26	12	7	7	58	42	+16	43	
6	Dollingstown	26	13	2	11	50	45	+5	41	
7	Coagh United	26	10	6	10	40	36	+4	36	
8	Banbridge Town	26	10	3	13	50	57	−7	33	
9	Lisburn Distillery	26	9	4	13	31	45	−14	31	
10	Warrenpoint Town	26	8	6	12	38	41	−3	30	
11	Moyola Park	26	9	2	15	33	49	−16	29	
12	Portstewart	26	7	4	15	27	46	−19	25	
13	Tobermore United	26	7	4	15	28	56	−28	25	
14	PSNI (R)	26	6	1	19	29	69	−40	19	Relegation to Level 4

Source: NIFL Premier Intermediate
Rules for classification: 1) Points per game; 2) Goal difference; 3) Number of goals scored; 4) Head-to-head points; 5) Head-to-head goal difference; 6) Drawing of lots
(C) Champions; (O) Play-off winners; (P) Promoted; (R) Relegated

== Results ==
Each team plays every other team twice (home and away).

Home \ Away	ARM	BAL	BAB	COA	DOL	LIM	LIS	MOY	POR	PSN	QUE	RAT	TOB	WAR
Armagh City	—	3–2	0–3	3–1	1–0	2–1	3–2	1–1	2–1	4–0	2–3	1–0	4–3	3–0
Ballymacash Rangers	2–2	—	0–0	3–1	2–0	3–4	4–2	2–0	4–1	7–1	3–1	2–1	2–2	1–1
Banbridge Town	3–2	1–2	—	2–1	1–4	1–3	0–1	2–1	1–3	4–1	1–1	0–2	6–1	4–1
Coagh United	3–3	3–2	1–1	—	1–2	1–1	0–1	1–4	3–0	2–0	2–1	0–1	4–1	4–1
Dollingstown	1–2	1–2	3–2	2–2	—	1–7	2–0	1–3	3–2	2–1	5–1	0–1	1–0	3–1
Limavady United	2–1	2–1	9–1	1–0	1–3	—	3–2	3–2	3–0	4–1	4–1	0–3	6–0	2–0
Lisburn Distillery	0–0	1–3	3–2	1–1	3–1	0–3	—	5–1	1–0	2–1	0–4	0–2	2–1	3–1
Moyola Park	1–4	1–0	2–5	0–1	0–3	0–1	2–0	—	1–0	3–2	0–2	2–1	0–1	0–3
Portstewart	1–1	1–2	2–1	1–0	2–1	1–1	1–1	0–2	—	3–1	1–2	1–2	1–2	2–0
PSNI	1–3	1–4	1–4	0–1	1–4	0–2	3–0	3–2	3–1	—	1–1	0–2	0–3	2–0
Queen's University	2–2	3–0	6–1	2–1	2–4	3–3	1–1	2–2	2–0	1–2	—	1–4	5–0	1–0
Rathfriland Rangers	0–1	1–2	0–2	1–3	2–2	1–1	3–0 (Note: Originally a 3–4 win for Lisburn Distillery; Rathfriland Rangers awarded a 3–0 win after Lisburn Distillery fielded an ineligible player.)	3–0	6–0	3–0	1–5	—	0–0	3–0
Tobermore United	1–3	1–3	2–1	1–2	3–1	0–2	1–0	3–1	0–1	0–2	0–3	2–2	—	0–0
Warrenpoint Town	2–2	1–0	5–1	1–1	2–0	3–2	2–0	0–1	1–1	7–1	2–2	1–2	3–0	—

Source: NIFL Premier Intermediate
Legend: Blue = home team win; Yellow = draw; Red = away team win.
For upcoming matches, an "a" indicates there is an article about the rivalry between the two participants.

== NIFL Premier Intermediate League play-off ==
The 2023–24 Ballymena & Provincial Football League champions (Strabane Athletic) faced the 2023–24 Mid-Ulster Football League champions (Oxford Sunnyside) in a two-legged play-off for the final place in the following season's NIFL Premier Intermediate League.

=== First leg ===
28 May 2024	Oxford Sunnyside	1–1	Strabane Athletic	Lurgan
20:00				Stadium: Knockramer Park

=== Second leg ===
31 May 2024	Strabane Athletic	1–2 (2–3 agg.)	Oxford Sunnyside	Strabane
				Stadium: Melvin Sports Complex
