= 2024–25 NIFL Premier Intermediate League =

NIFL Premier Intermediate League
- Season: 2024–25
- Dates: 24 August 2024 – 2 May 2025
- Champions: Warrenpoint Town
- Promoted: Queen's University; Warrenpoint Town
- Relegated: Tobermore United

The 2024–25 NIFL Premier Intermediate League (known as the Playr-Fit Premier Intermediate League for sponsorship reasons) was the eighth season of the NIFL Premier Intermediate League (the third tier of the Northern Ireland Football League - the national football league in Northern Ireland).

== Teams ==
The league consisted of fourteen teams; eleven teams remaining from the previous season, one team promoted from Level 4, and two teams relegated from the NIFL Championship.

The promoted team was the 2023–24 NIFL Premier Intermediate League play-off winners Oxford Sunnyside. They replaced the 2023–24 NIFL Premier Intermediate League bottom placed team PSNI.

The relegated teams were 2023–24 NIFL Championship play-off losers Dergview and bottom-placed team Knockbreda. They replaced the 2023–24 NIFL Championship champions Limavady United and play-off winners Armagh City.

Locations of the 2024–25 NIFL Premier Intermediate teams

Club	Stadium	Location	Capacity
Ballymacash Rangers	The Bluebell Stadium	Lisburn	1,280
Banbridge Town	Crystal Park	Banbridge	1,500
Coagh United	Hagan Park	Coagh	1,000 (150 seated)
Dergview	Darragh Park	Castlederg	1,280
Dollingstown	Planter's Park	Dollingstown	1,000
Moyola Park	Fortwilliam Park	Tobermore	2,000 (100 seated)
Knockbreda	Breda Park	Belfast	
Oxford Sunnyside	Knockramer Park	Lurgan	1,600
Lisburn Distillery	New Grosvenor Stadium	Lisburn	1,500 (790 seated)
Portstewart	Mullaghacall	Portstewart	1,000
Queen's University	Upper Malone	Belfast	1,000 (330 seated)
Rathfriland Rangers	Iveagh Park	Rathfriland	
Tobermore United	Fortwilliam Park	Tobermore	2,000 (100 seated)
Warrenpoint Town	Milltown	Warrenpoint	1,450

== League table ==
Pos	Team	Pld	W	D	L	GF	GA	GD	Pts	Promotion, qualification or relegation
1	Warrenpoint Town (C, P)	26	19	2	5	52	27	+25	59	Promotion to the NIFL Championship
2	Queen's University (O, P)	26	17	3	6	55	30	+25	54	Qualification for the NIFL Championship play-off
3	Rathfriland Rangers	26	16	1	9	59	30	+29	49	
4	Dollingstown	26	15	4	7	59	35	+24	49	
5	Ballymacash Rangers	26	11	6	9	44	37	+7	39	
6	Oxford Sunnyside	26	11	6	9	51	51	0	39	
7	Moyola Park	26	11	5	10	48	44	+4	38	
8	Portstewart	26	10	4	12	33	48	−15	34	
9	Knockbreda	26	8	7	11	43	52	−9	31	
10	Lisburn Distillery	26	7	9	10	41	47	−6	30	
11	Banbridge Town	26	7	8	11	32	41	−9	29	
12	Dergview	26	8	2	16	32	59	−27	26	
13	Coagh United	26	6	3	17	35	59	−24	21	
14	Tobermore United (R)	26	4	4	18	30	54	−24	16	Relegation to Level 4

Source: NIFL Premier Intermediate
Rules for classification: 1) Points per game; 2) Goal difference; 3) Number of goals scored; 4) Head-to-head points; 5) Head-to-head goal difference; 6) Drawing of lots
(C) Champions; (O) Play-off winners; (P) Promoted; (R) Relegated

== Results ==
Each team plays every other team twice (home and away).

Home \ Away	BAL	BAN	COA	DER	DOL	KNO	LIS	MOY	OXF	POR	QUE	RAT	TOB	WAR
Ballymacash Rangers	—	1–1	0–2	2–1	1–2	0–2	2–2	1–0	1–1	1–3	0–2	1–3	3–0	0–1
Banbridge Town	1–3	—	1–0	3–0	2–1	2–2	1–2	2–3	2–2	1–2	2–0	1–0	2–0	2–3
Coagh United	1–2	2–2	—	4–2	0–2	4–2	3–1	2–1	1–2	2–2	2–1	1–2	1–1	0–3
Dergview	0–1	1–0	1–0	—	1–2	2–3	2–0	2–1	1–2	1–1	3–1	1–3	1–2	1–0
Dollingstown	4–1	2–1	2–1	3–0	—	5–1	3–3	0–1	2–2	0–1	1–3	2–3	2–1	3–0
Knockbreda	0–3	0–1	3–0	3–3	1–4	—	1–1	2–1	0–1	2–3	2–4	0–3	2–0	1–1
Lisburn Distillery	2–4	1–1	4–2	2–0	0–1	1–1	—	2–2	5–1	0–1	0–0	1–3	4–2	0–2
Moyola Park	1–1	2–1	5–1	2–3	3–3	2–3	3–3	—	5–0	0–0	0–2	0–3	3–0	3–2
Oxford Sunnyside	1–1	4–0	3–0	6–2	0–3	3–3	2–1	0–2	—	2–1	2–3	1–5	4–3	3–0
Portstewart	1–6	1–1	2–1	4–1	0–3	0–2	1–3	0–1	2–4	—	1–0	0–5	2–1	2–3
Queen's University	0–6	3–1	5–0	3–0	4–4	0–0	3–0	6–1	3–2	3–0	—	1–0	3–1	1–0
Rathfriland Rangers	0–1	0–0	3–1	6–0	3–0	5–3	0–2	2–3	1–0	3–2	1–2	—	2–1	0–1
Tobermore United	2–2	4–0	4–2	1–2	1–4	1–4	0–0	1–2	1–1	0–1	0–2	2–1	—	1–3
Warrenpoint Town	4–0	1–1	3–2	4–1	1–0	2–0	6–1	2–1	3–2	2–0	1–0	3–2	1–0	—

Source: NIFL Premier Intermediate
Legend: Blue = home team win; Yellow = draw; Red = away team win.
For upcoming matches, an "a" indicates there is an article about the rivalry between the two participants.

== NIFL Premier Intermediate League play-off ==
The 2024–25 Ballymena & Provincial Football League champions will face the 2024–25 Mid-Ulster Football League champions in a two-legged play-off for the final place in the 2025–26 NIFL Premier Intermediate League.
