= 2022–23 NIFL Premier Intermediate League =

NIFL Premier Intermediate League
- Season: 2022–23
- Dates: 20 Aug 2022 – 2 May 2023
- Champions: Bangor
- Promoted: Bangor
- Matches played: 162
- Goals scored: 525 (3.24 per match)

The 2022–23 NIFL Premier Intermediate League (known as the Lough 41 Premier Intermediate League for sponsorship reasons) was the sixth season of the NIFL Premier Intermediate League, the third tier of the Northern Ireland Football League - the national football league in Northern Ireland. The season began on 20 August 2022.

Newington were the champions of the previous season and promoted to the 2022–23 NIFL Championship. They were replaced by Queen's University, who were relegated from the 2021–22 NIFL Championship. 2021–22 Mid-Ulster Football League champions Ballymacash Rangers defeated 2021–22 Ballymena & Provincial Football League champions St James' Swifts in a promotion playoff to earn promotion to the NIFL Premier Intermediate League, increasing the number of teams by one.

== Teams ==
Locations of the 2022–23 NIFL Premier Intermediate teams

Club	Stadium	Location	Capacity
Armagh City	Holm Park	Armagh	2,000
Ballymacash Rangers	The Bluebell Stadium	Lisburn	1,280
Banbridge Town	Crystal Park	Banbridge	1,500
Bangor	Clandeboye Park	Bangor	1,895 (500 seated)
Dollingstown	Planter's Park	Dollingstown	1,000
Limavady United	The Showgrounds	Limavady	1,500 (274 seated)
Lisburn Distillery	New Grosvenor Stadium	Ballyskeagh	7,000 (540 seated)
Moyola Park	Mill Meadow	Castledawson	1,000
Portstewart	Mullaghacall	Portstewart	1,000
PSNI	The Dub	Belfast	1,000 (330 seated)
Queen's University	Upper Malone	Belfast	1,000 (330 seated)
Tobermore United	Fortwilliam Park	Tobermore	2,000 (100 seated)

== League table ==
Pos	Team	Pld	W	D	L	GF	GA	GD	Pts	Promotion, qualification or relegation (Note: Teams play each other twice (22 matches), before the league is split into two groups (the top six and the bottom six).)
1	Bangor (C, P)	27	22	4	1	67	14	+53	70	Promotion to the NIFL Championship
2	Ballymacash Rangers	27	18	6	3	67	24	+43	60	Qualification for the NIFL Championship play-off
3	Queen's University	27	16	3	8	60	47	+13	51	
4	Limavady United	27	13	7	7	47	29	+18	46	
5	Moyola Park	27	9	7	11	37	36	+1	34	
6	Tobermore United	27	9	5	13	39	45	−6	32	
7	Lisburn Distillery	27	10	4	13	34	53	−19	34	
8	Portstewart	27	9	5	13	35	44	−9	32	
9	Armagh City	27	7	7	13	38	58	−20	28	
10	Dollingstown	27	7	3	17	36	50	−14	24	
11	Banbridge Town	27	7	3	17	31	52	−21	24	
12	PSNI (Note: PSNI were reprieved from relegation after Warrenpoint Town were expelled from the NIFL Championship and relegated to the NIFL Premier Intermediate League.)	27	6	4	17	34	73	−39	22	

Source: NIFL Premier Intermediate
Rules for classification: 1) Points per game; 2) Goal difference; 3) Number of goals scored; 4) Head-to-head points; 5) Head-to-head goal difference; 6) Drawing of lots
(C) Champions; (P) Promoted

== Results ==
=== Matches 1–22 ===
During matches 1–22 each team plays every other team twice (home and away).

Home \ Away	ARM	BAL	BAB	BAG	DOL	LIM	LIS	MOY	POR	PSN	QUE	TOB
Armagh City	—	0–3	2–0	0–3	1–1	0–3	1–2	2–2	2–1	2–3	2–4	0–4
Ballymacash Rangers	2–2	—	6–1	1–1	4–2	3–0	2–2	1–0	1–2	5–0	2–3	2–1
Banbridge Town	1–2	1–3	—	0–2	1–4	0–2	3–2	1–3	3–1	0–0	2–1	2–3
Bangor	5–0	2–0	4–0	—	3–0	1–0	5–0	1–0	4–0	2–0	1–1	3–0
Dollingstown	4–0	1–1	1–0	1–4	—	1–2	4–0	0–0	2–0	6–0	1–2	2–3
Limavady United	2–1	1–1	1–1	0–1	2–0	—	3–0	2–1	3–1	3–1	2–3	1–2
Lisburn Distillery	1–4	0–2	0–3	0–5	2–0	1–1	—	1–0	0–0	3–1	2–1	1–2
Moyola Park	3–0	0–3	2–1	0–2	3–0	2–2	1–0	—	2–1	5–0	0–2	1–1
Portstewart	2–2	0–3	0–2	1–2	1–2	0–2	1–2	0–0	—	2–0	2–3	2–0
PSNI	2–2	0–8	3–2	1–2	4–1	1–2	2–5	2–6	1–2	—	0–3	2–2
Queen's University	2–1	0–3	3–1	1–2	1–0	1–1	2–1	3–1	3–4	3–2	—	2–1
Tobermore United	3–3	0–2	1–2	2–0	2–1	0–5	0–1	1–2	2–3	4–0	1–1	—

Source: NIFL Premier Intermediate
Legend: Blue = home team win; Yellow = draw; Red = away team win.
For upcoming matches, an "a" indicates there is an article about the rivalry between the two participants.

=== Matches 23–27 ===
For the final five matches, the table splits into two halves, with the top six teams forming Section A and the bottom six teams forming Section B. Each team plays every other team in their respective section once.

==== Section A ====
Home \ Away	BAL	BAG	LIM	MOY	QUE	TOB
Ballymacash Rangers	—	—	1–0	—	—	1–0
Bangor	1–1	—	2–2	3–1	—	—
Limavady United	—	—	—	1–1	4–2	0–1
Moyola Park	0–1	—	—	—	1–5	0–0
Queen's University	4–5	1–3	—	—	—	—
Tobermore United	—	1–3	—	—	2–3	—

Source: NIFL Premier Intermediate
Legend: Blue = home team win; Yellow = draw; Red = away team win.

==== Section B ====
Home \ Away	ARM	BAB	DOL	LIS	POR	PSN
Armagh City	—	—	2–0	—	1–1	0–2
Banbridge Town	1–2	—	—	—	0–1	1–1
Dollingstown	—	0–1	—	—	—	0–3
Lisburn Distillery	1–4	2–1	3–1	—	—	—
Portstewart	—	—	5–1	1–1	—	—
PSNI	—	—	—	3–1	0–1	—

Source: NIFL Premier Intermediate
Legend: Blue = home team win; Yellow = draw; Red = away team win.
