= 2022–23 NIFL Championship =

NIFL Championship
- Season: 2022–23
- Dates: 13 Aug 2022 – 29 Apr 2023
- Champions: Loughgall
- Promoted: Loughgall
- Relegated: Warrenpoint Town

The 2022–23 NIFL Championship (known as the Lough 41 Championship for sponsorship reasons) was the sixth season of the NIFL Championship since gaining senior status. It is the second-tier of the Northern Ireland Football League - the national football league in Northern Ireland. The season began on 13 August 2022 and concluded on 29 April 2023.

Newry City were the champions of the previous season and promoted to the 2022–23 NIFL Premiership. They were replaced by Warrenpoint Town, who were relegated from the 2021–22 NIFL Premiership. Queen's University were relegated to the 2022–23 NIFL Premier Intermediate League and replaced by Newington, the champions of the 2021–22 NIFL Premier Intermediate League.

== Teams ==
Locations of the 2022–23 NIFL Championship teams
Locations of the Belfast-based 2022–23 NIFL Championship teams

=== Stadia and locations ===
Club	Stadium	Location	Capacity
Annagh United	Tandragee Road	Portadown	1,250 (100 seated)
Ards	Bangor Fuels Arena	Bangor	1,895 (500 seated)
Ballinamallard United	Ferney Park	Ballinamallard	2,000 (250 seated)
Ballyclare Comrades	Dixon Park	Ballyclare	5,333
Dergview	Darragh Park	Castlederg	1,200
Dundela	Wilgar Park	Belfast	2,500
Harland & Wolff Welders	Tillysburn Park	Belfast	3,000
Institute	Ryan McBride Brandywell Stadium	Derry	8,200
Knockbreda	Breda Park	Belfast	1,000
Loughgall	Lakeview Park	Loughgall	3,000
Newington	Solitude	Belfast	8,000 (3,000 seated)
Warrenpoint Town	Milltown	Warrenpoint	1,450

== League table ==
Pos	Team	Pld	W	D	L	GF	GA	GD	Pts	Promotion, qualification or relegation (Note: Teams play each other three times (33 matches), before the league is split into two groups (the top six and the bottom six).)
1	Loughgall (C, P)	38	23	8	7	76	25	+51	77	Promotion to the NIFL Premiership
2	Warrenpoint Town (D, R)	38	21	8	9	67	45	+22	71	Administrative relegation to the NIFL Championship (Note: Warrenpoint Town were refused an NIFL Championship license, resulting in disqualification from this season and demotion to the NIFL Intermediate League for the next season. Annagh United, who were in third place, accepted the NIFL's invite to take Warrenpoint's place in the NIFL Premiership play-off. Institute were reprieved from the NIFL Championship play-off and thus reprieved from relegation and replaced by Knockbreda, who were reprieved from automatic relegation, but had to compete again to stay in the division.)
3	Annagh United	38	17	8	13	58	43	+15	59	Qualification for the NIFL Premiership play-off
4	Dundela	38	18	4	16	57	58	−1	58	
5	Ards	38	17	5	16	72	75	−3	56	
6	Harland & Wolff Welders	38	17	4	17	69	65	+4	55	
7	Ballyclare Comrades	38	14	13	11	66	63	+3	55	
8	Ballinamallard United	38	14	10	14	50	59	−9	52	
9	Newington	38	12	7	19	64	73	−9	43	
10	Dergview	38	11	8	19	51	68	−17	41	
11	Institute	38	10	8	20	50	63	−13	38	
12	Knockbreda (O)	38	8	9	21	47	90	−43	33	Qualification for the NIFL Championship play-off

Source: NIFL Championship
Rules for classification: 1) Points; 2) Goal difference; 3) Number of goals scored; 4) Head-to-head points; 5) Head-to-head goal difference; 6) Drawing of lots
(C) Champions; (D) Disqualified; (O) Play-off winners; (P) Promoted; (R) Relegated

== Results ==
=== Matches 1–22 ===
During matches 1–22 each team plays every other team twice (home and away).

Home \ Away	ANN	ARD	BMD	BCC	DGV	DUN	HAR	INS	KNB	LGL	NEW	WAR
Annagh United	—	2–1	4–0	1–1	3–0	3–0	2–1	2–1	2–0	1–1	3–1	1–1
Ards	2–1	—	2–0	2–1	5–2	1–0	0–1	1–1	4–1	0–5	1–2	3–5
Ballinamallard United	0–3	4–1	—	1–1	0–0	1–2	2–1	2–1	2–1	0–2	1–1	1–1
Ballyclare Comrades	2–2	3–2	0–0	—	0–1	5–2	0–0	1–0	3–2	0–4	1–1	1–1
Dergview	1–0	2–3	1–2	0–3	—	0–1	2–3	0–3	2–3	2–0	3–0	0–3
Dundela	1–2	1–5	4–0	0–2	1–1	—	3–0	1–0	2–1	0–1	2–1	1–0
Harland & Wolff Welders	1–3	0–2	0–1	0–5	3–2	2–1	—	5–0	7–1	2–1	0–1	1–1
Institute	1–2	2–0	1–1	2–0	2–2	0–2	1–0	—	2–1	1–1	0–2	1–1
Knockbreda	1–1	1–4	1–2	1–1	3–3	0–0	4–2	2–3	—	0–1	1–0	1–2
Loughgall	3–0	6–1	3–0	2–1	1–0	0–1	4–0	1–0	3–0	—	2–1	3–0 (Note: Originally a 2–0 win for Loughall; Loughall awarded a 3–0 win after Warrenpoint Town fielded an ineligible player.)
Newington	1–4	2–2	3–4	5–2	4–1	2–3	2–1	3–3	3–0 (Note: Originally a 0–2 win for Knockbreda; Newington awarded a 3–0 win after Knockbreda fielded an ineligible player.)	0–2	—	0–1
Warrenpoint Town	1–0	2–1	1–1	0–1	4–2	0–3	3–2	2–0	4–0	2–0	2–0	—

Source: NIFL Championship
Legend: Blue = home team win; Yellow = draw; Red = away team win.
For upcoming matches, an "a" indicates there is an article about the rivalry between the two participants.

=== Matches 23–33 ===
During matches 23–33 each team plays every other team for the third time (either at home, or away).

Home \ Away	ANN	ARD	BMD	BCC	DGV	DUN	HAR	INS	KNB	LGL	NEW	WAR
Annagh United	—	—	0–2	1–3	2–1	—	—	—	0–0	—	—	0–1
Ards	2–0	—	—	3–3	—	1–1	—	—	—	0–3	2–1	—
Ballinamallard United	—	1–0	—	2–0	2–2	1–3	—	—	—	—	2–2	—
Ballyclare Comrades	—	—	—	—	0–4	1–0	—	6–2	1–2	2–2	—	3–2
Dergview	—	2–1	—	—	—	2–3	—	2–1	1–1	—	3–0	—
Dundela	0–3	—	—	—	—	—	2–3	1–0	2–3	—	3–4	2–1
Harland & Wolff Welders	0–0	2–5	3–1	5–1	3–0	—	—	—	—	0–0	—	—
Institute	2–0	1–1	0–2	—	—	—	0–1	—	8–1	—	—	—
Knockbreda	—	3–2	3–2	—	—	—	0–3	—	—	0–0	0–3	1–4
Loughgall	4–1	—	1–1	—	0–1	0–1	—	5–1	—	—	1–0	—
Newington	1–2	—	—	2–2	—	—	0–3	1–4	—	—	—	1–4
Warrenpoint Town	—	1–4	2–1	—	3–0	—	3–1	2–1	—	1–3	—	—

Source: NIFL Championship
Legend: Blue = home team win; Yellow = draw; Red = away team win.
For upcoming matches, an "a" indicates there is an article about the rivalry between the two participants.

=== Matches 34–38 ===
For the final five matches, the table splits into two halves, with the top six teams forming Section A and the bottom six teams forming Section B. Each team plays every other team in their respective section once. The fixtures are reversed from those played during rounds 23–33, ensuring that teams have played every other team in their respective section twice at home and twice away overall throughout the season.

==== Section A ====
Home \ Away	ANN	ARD	BCC	DUN	LGL	WAR
Annagh United	—	1–2	—	4–0	0–0	—
Ards	—	—	—	—	—	1–0
Ballyclare Comrades	2–1	5–1	—	—	—	—
Dundela	—	2–4	4–0	—	1–3	—
Loughgall	—	5–0	2–2	—	—	1–2
Warrenpoint Town	2–1	—	1–1	1–1	—	—

Source: NIFL
Legend: Blue = home team win; Yellow = draw; Red = away team win.

==== Section B ====
Home \ Away	BMD	DGV	HAR	INS	KNB	NEW
Ballinamallard United	—	—	3–2	0–1	4–1	—
Dergview	1–0	—	2–0	—	—	—
Harland & Wolff Welders	—	—	—	3–1	3–2	5–4
Institute	—	1–1	—	—	—	0–2
Knockbreda	—	1–1	—	3–2	—	—
Newington	4–1	3–1	—	—	1–1	—

Source: NIFL
Legend: Blue = home team win; Yellow = draw; Red = away team win.

== NIFL Championship play-off ==
The eleventh-placed club (Institute) were expected to face the second-placed club from the 2022–23 NIFL Premier Intermediate League (Ballymacash Rangers) for one place in the following season's Championship. However, after Warrenpoint Town were disqualified and expelled from the NIFL Championship, Institute were reprieved from the play-off and replaced by the bottom-placed NIFL Championship club, Knockbreda.

=== First leg ===
30 May 2023	Ballymacash Rangers	2–4	Knockbreda	The Bluebell Stadium
19:45 BST (UTC+01)	Barr 34'; Morrison 90+3'		Rutkowski 45+5', 70'; McGreevy 47'; Greer 55'

=== Second leg ===
3 June 2023	Knockbreda	0–0 (4–2 agg.)	Ballymacash Rangers	Breda Park
13:00 BST (UTC+01)

== Season statistics ==
=== Top scorers ===
Rank	Player	Club	Goals
1	Adam Salley	Ards	27
2	Matthew Ferguson	H&W Welders	26
3	Stephen Murray	Annagh United	18
-	Darius Roohi	Ballyclare Comrades	18
