= 2025–26 NIFL Championship =

NIFL Championship
- Season: 2025–26
- Champions: Limavady United
- Promoted: Limavady United

The 2025–26 NIFL Championship (known as the Playr-Fit Championship for sponsorship reasons) was the ninth season of the NIFL Championship (the second-tier of the Irish League - the national football league in Northern Ireland) since gaining senior status.

== Teams ==
The league consisted of twelve teams; nine teams remaining from the previous season, two teams promoted from the NIFL Premier Intermediate League, and one team relegated from the NIFL Premiership. With the league expanding to sixteen teams for the following season, no team will be relegated this season.

The promoted teams were the 2024–25 NIFL Premier Intermediate League champions Warrenpoint Town and 2024–25 NIFL Championship play-off winners Queen's University. They replaced the NIFL Championship play-off losers Ballyclare Comrades and bottom-placed team Newry City.

The relegated team was the 2024–25 NIFL Premiership bottom-placed team Loughgall. They replaced the 2024–25 NIFL Championship champions Bangor.

Locations of the 2025–26 NIFL Championship teams
Locations of the Belfast-based 2025–26 NIFL Championship teams

=== Stadia and locations ===
Club	Stadium	Location	Capacity
Annagh United	BMG Arena	Portadown	1,250 (100 seated)
Ards	Clandeboye Park	Bangor	1,895 (500 seated)
Armagh City	Holm Park	Armagh	2,000 (500 seated)
Ballinamallard United	Ferney Park	Ballinamallard	2,000 (250 seated)
Dundela	Wilgar Park	Belfast	2,500
Harland & Wolff Welders	Blanchflower Stadium	Belfast	3,000 (2,000 seated)
Institute	Ryan McBride Brandywell Stadium	Derry	3,700
Limavady United	The Showgrounds	Limavady	524 (274 seated)
Loughgall	Lakeview Park	Loughgall	3,000
Newington	Inver Park	Larne	3,000
Queen's University	Upper Malone	Belfast	1,000 (330 seated)
Warrenpoint Town	Milltown	Warrenpoint	1,450

== Regular season ==
=== League table ===
Pos	Team	Pld	W	D	L	GF	GA	GD	Pts	Qualification
1	Limavady United	33	21	8	4	61	32	+29	71	Qualification for Section A
2	Annagh United	33	22	5	6	54	27	+27	71	Qualification for Section A
3	Harland & Wolff Welders	33	17	8	8	77	41	+36	59	Qualification for Section A
4	Newington	33	15	6	12	69	52	+17	51	Qualification for Section A
5	Loughgall	33	13	12	8	46	34	+12	51	Qualification for Section A
6	Queen's University	33	12	11	10	43	42	+1	47	Qualification for Section A
7	Institute	33	13	7	13	47	43	+4	46	Qualification for Section B
8	Ards	33	12	7	14	50	46	+4	43	Qualification for Section B
9	Warrenpoint Town	33	10	6	17	44	50	−6	36	Qualification for Section B
10	Ballinamallard United	33	8	10	15	36	52	−16	34	Qualification for Section B
11	Dundela	33	3	11	19	37	73	−36	20	Qualification for Section B
12	Armagh City	33	4	5	24	28	100	−72	17	Qualification for Section B

Source: NIFL Championship
Rules for classification: 1) Points; 2) Goal difference; 3) Number of goals scored; 4) Head-to-head points; 5) Head-to-head goal difference; 6) Drawing of lots

=== Results ===
For matches 1–22, each team plays every other team twice (home and away). For matches 23–33, each team plays every other team for the third time (either at home or away).

Home \ Away	ANN	ARD	ARM	BMD	DUN	HAR	INS	LIM	LOU	NEW	QUE	WAR	ANN	ARD	ARM	BMD	DUN	HAR	INS	LIM	LOU	NEW	QUE	WAR
Annagh United	—	3–1	2–0	0–1	2–1	2–0	2–0	2–0	1–1	2–1	0–2	1–0	—	3–2	3–0	—	1–1	2–1	3–1	—	—	3–2	—	—
Ards	1–2	—	2–1	3–1	1–0	1–4	0–3	1–4	1–1	2–1	2–3	0–0	—	—	—	2–1	—	2–3	0–0	2–0	—	—	—	3–0
Armagh City	1–2	1–0	—	0–3	3–0	0–3	1–3	1–1	0–0	2–4	0–2	0–2	—	0–8	—	0–0	0–3	—	—	—	—	1–2	—	1–5
Ballinamallard United	1–1	1–0	3–1	—	2–1	1–0	2–2	1–1	0–1	3–3	0–3	0–4	0–0	—	—	—	—	1–1	0–1	0–1	—	—	1–1	—
Dundela	0–3	1–4	1–3	2–2	—	3–3	2–2	1–2	2–2	1–0	1–3	3–2	—	1–1	—	1–4	—	—	—	1–1	0–3	—	1–1	—
Harland & Wolff Welders	0–0	1–2	3–0	3–0	4–0	—	2–1	2–3	1–1	3–2	1–1	1–1	—	—	12–0	—	3–1	—	1–4	1–4	2–1	2–1	—	—
Institute	1–0	2–2	2–1	0–0	1–1	0–4	—	1–2	2–0	0–1	1–0	1–0	—	—	6–0	—	2–1	—	—	1–2	—	3–3	0–1	—
Limavady United	1–0	1–0	3–1	4–2	3–0	0–3	1–0	—	1–0	0–0	3–0	1–0	1–3	—	5–0	—	—	—	—	—	0–0	3–2	—	3–3
Loughgall	2–3	1–1	2–1	2–1	2–1	1–2	2–0	1–1	—	2–2	2–0	1–1	3–0	0–1	1–1	1–0	—	—	1–3	—	—	2–1	4–0	1–0
Newington	1–5	0–3	5–1	4–1	2–2	2–1	4–1	1–4	2–3	—	2–0	3–0	—	2–0	—	4–0	2–0	—	—	—	—	—	2–0	4–0
Queen's University	0–1	1–0	1–1	0–3	1–1	0–3	2–1	2–2	2–2	0–0	—	2–0	1–0	2–2	8–1	—	—	2–2	—	0–2	—	—	—	1–0
Warrenpoint Town	0–1	2–0	3–5	4–1	3–1	2–2	1–0	0–1	1–0	2–4	1–1	—	0–1	—	—	1–0	5–2	0–3	1–2	—	—	—	—	—

Source: NIFL Championship
Legend: Blue = home team win; Yellow = draw; Red = away team win.
For upcoming matches, an "a" indicates there is an article about the rivalry between the two participants.

== Matches 34–38 ==
For the final five matches, the table splits into two halves, with the top six teams forming Section A and the bottom six teams forming Section B. Each team plays every other team in their respective section once. The fixtures are reversed from those played during rounds 23–33, ensuring that teams have played every other team in their respective section twice at home and twice away overall throughout the season.

=== Section A ===
==== League table ====
Pos	Team	Pld	W	D	L	GF	GA	GD	Pts	Promotion or qualification
1	Limavady United (C, P)	38	24	9	5	69	34	+35	81	Promotion to the NIFL Premiership
2	Annagh United	38	22	6	10	55	39	+16	72	Qualification for the NIFL Premiership play-off
3	Harland & Wolff Welders	38	19	9	10	87	48	+39	66	
4	Newington	38	18	6	14	77	62	+15	60	
5	Queen's University	38	15	12	11	51	46	+5	57	
6	Loughgall	38	14	14	10	50	38	+12	56	

Source: NIFL Championship
Rules for classification: 1) Points; 2) Goal difference; 3) Number of goals scored; 4) Head-to-head points; 5) Head-to-head goal difference; 6) Drawing of lots
(C) Champions; (P) Promoted

==== Results ====
Home \ Away	ANN	HAR	LIM	LOU	NEW	QUE
Annagh United	—	—	0–2	1–1	—	0–4
Harland & Wolff Welders	4–0	—	—	—	—	2–3
Limavady United	—	0–0	—	—	—	0–1
Loughgall	—	2–0	0–1	—	—	—
Newington	1–0	2–4	1–5	2–1	—	—
Queen's University	—	—	—	0–0	0–2	—

Source: NIFL Championship
Legend: Blue = home team win; Yellow = draw; Red = away team win.
For upcoming matches, an "a" indicates there is an article about the rivalry between the two participants.

=== Section B ===
==== League table ====
Pos	Team	Pld	W	D	L	GF	GA	GD	Pts
7	Institute	38	17	8	13	59	46	+13	59
8	Ards	38	15	7	16	56	51	+5	52
9	Warrenpoint Town	38	11	8	19	45	53	−8	41
10	Ballinamallard United	38	9	11	18	44	60	−16	38
11	Dundela	38	5	13	20	43	77	−34	28
12	Armagh City	38	4	7	27	30	112	−82	19

Source: NIFL Championship
Rules for classification: 1) Points; 2) Goal difference; 3) Number of goals scored; 4) Head-to-head points; 5) Head-to-head goal difference; 6) Drawing of lots

==== Results ====
Home \ Away	ARD	ARM	BMD	DUN	INS	WAR
Ards	—	2–1	—	0–1	—	—
Armagh City	—	—	—	—	1–4	—
Ballinamallard United	0–2	6–0	—	2–2	—	0–1
Dundela	—	0–0	—	—	1–2	2–0
Institute	3–1	—	3–0	—	—	0–0
Warrenpoint Town	0–1	0–0	—	—	—	—

Source: NIFL Championship
Legend: Blue = home team win; Yellow = draw; Red = away team win.
For upcoming matches, an "a" indicates there is an article about the rivalry between the two participants.
