= 2023–24 NIFL Premiership =

NIFL Premiership
- Season: 2023–24
- Dates: 4 Aug 2023 – 27 Apr 2024
- Champions: Larne
- Relegated: Newry City
- UEFA Champions League: Larne
- UEFA Conference League: Cliftonville; Crusaders; Linfield
- Matches: 228
- Goals: 707 (3.1 per match)
- Top goalscorer: Andy Ryan (24 goals)
- Biggest home win: Crusaders 9–0 Carrick Rangers (22 August 2023)
- Biggest away win: Newry City 0–4 Crusaders (26 August 2023); Coleraine 0–4 Crusaders (30 September 2023); Glenavon 0–4 Larne (30 September 2023); Newry City 0–4 Glenavon (26 December 2023)
- Highest scoring: Glentoran 8–2 Newry City (17 February 2024)
- Highest attendance: 9,047 Linfield 2–0 Glentoran (26 December 2023)
- Lowest attendance: 257 Carrick Rangers 2–2 Loughgall F.C. (2 December 2023)
- Total attendance: 360,525
- Average attendance: 1,581

The 2023–24 NIFL Premiership (known as the Sports Direct Premiership for sponsorship reasons) was the 16th season of the NIFL Premiership (the highest level of league football in Northern Ireland), the 123rd season of Irish League football overall, and the 11th season of the league operating as part of the Northern Ireland Football League. The 38-game season commenced on 4 August 2023 and concluded on 27 April 2024.

The champions (Larne, their second consecutive title win) qualified for the 2024–25 UEFA Champions League first qualifying round. The 2023–24 Irish Cup winners (Cliftonville) qualified for the 2024–25 UEFA Conference League second qualifying round, with the second-placed team (Linfield) and Conference League play-off winners (Crusaders) qualifying for the first qualifying round. The eleventh-placed team (Ballymena United) qualified for the NIFL Premiership play-off, winning and retaining their place in the league. The bottom-placed team (Newry City) were relegated to the 2024–25 NIFL Championship.

== Teams ==
The league consisted of twelve teams; eleven teams remaining from the previous season, and one team promoted from the NIFL Championship. Loughgall were promoted as champions of the 2022–23 NIFL Championship (returning to the top-flight for the first time since 2007), replacing the 2022–23 NIFL Premiership bottom-placed team Portadown. Larne entered the season as defending champions, having won their first league title in the previous season.

=== Stadia and locations ===
Locations of the 2023–24 NIFL Premiership teams
Locations of the Belfast-based 2023–24 NIFL Premiership teams

Club	Stadium	Location	Capacity
Ballymena United	The Showgrounds	Ballymena	4,100 (all seated)
Carrick Rangers	Loughshore Hotel Arena	Carrickfergus	2,100 (380 seated)
Cliftonville	Solitude	Belfast	3,054 (all seated)
Coleraine	The Showgrounds	Coleraine	4,843 (1,607 seated)
Crusaders	Seaview	Belfast	3,208 (all seated)
Dungannon Swifts	Stangmore Park	Dungannon	2,000 (300 seated)
Glenavon	Mourneview Park	Lurgan	3,302 (all seated)
Glentoran	The Oval	Belfast	6,054 (3,991 seated)
Larne	Inver Park	Larne	2,732 (1,632 seated)
Linfield	Windsor Park	Belfast	18,434 (all seated)
Loughgall	Lakeview Park	Loughgall	1,300
Newry City	The Showgrounds	Newry	2,275 (1,080 seated)

== League table ==
Pos	Team	Pld	W	D	L	GF	GA	GD	Pts	Qualification or relegation (Note: Teams played each other three times (33 matches), before the league was split into two groups (the top six and the bottom six).)
1	Larne (C)	38	27	9	2	85	21	+64	90	Qualification for the Champions League first qualifying round
2	Linfield	38	26	7	5	82	40	+42	85	Qualification for the Conference League first qualifying round
3	Cliftonville	38	23	6	9	80	43	+37	75	Qualification for the Conference League second qualifying round (Note: Cliftonville qualified for the Conference League second qualifying round by winning the 2023–24 Irish Cup.)
4	Crusaders (O)	38	19	7	12	61	43	+18	64	Qualification for the Conference League play-offs (Note: Crusaders qualified for the Conference League first qualifying round as play-off winners.)
5	Glentoran	38	17	9	12	74	43	+31	60	Qualification for the Conference League play-offs
6	Coleraine	38	12	10	16	47	69	−22	46	Qualification for the Conference League play-offs
7	Carrick Rangers	38	15	5	18	54	72	−18	50	Qualification for the Conference League play-offs
8	Dungannon Swifts	38	13	8	17	64	69	−5	47	
9	Loughgall	38	13	6	19	60	68	−8	45	
10	Glenavon	38	11	4	23	45	70	−25	37	
11	Ballymena United (O)	38	8	4	26	29	70	−41	28	Qualification for the NIFL Premiership play-off
12	Newry City (R)	38	4	5	29	26	99	−73	17	Relegation to the NIFL Championship

Source: Northern Ireland Football League, Soccerway
Rules for classification: 1) Points; 2) Goal difference; 3) Number of goals scored; 4) Head-to-head points; 5) Head-to-head goal difference; 6) Drawing of lots
(C) Champions; (O) Play-off winners; (R) Relegated

== Results ==
=== Matches 1–33 ===
For matches 1–22, each team plays every other team twice (home and away). For matches 23–33, each team plays every other team for the third time (either at home or away).

Home \ Away	BYM	CRK	CLF	COL	CRU	DUN	GLA	GLT	LAR	LIN	LGL	NEW	BYM	CRK	CLF	COL	CRU	DUN	GLA	GLT	LAR	LIN	LGL	NEW
Ballymena United	—	0–2	0–2	3–1	1–2	1–1	0–1	0–2	0–0	0–1	1–3	0–2	—	0–2	—	3–1	2–4	2–4	—	—	0–1	—	0–1	—
Carrick Rangers	0–1	—	0–3	2–0	0–1	2–1	1–3	2–1	1–2	1–2	2–2	0–2	—	—	0–1	—	—	2–1	0–2	—	—	2–3	—	0–1
Cliftonville	2–0	4–0	—	5–0	3–0	5–0	3–0	2–2	1–1	0–1	1–1	1–0	3–0	—	—	4–1	2–1	—	4–2	—	0–2	0–3	—	—
Coleraine	2–1	1–1	1–2	—	0–4	2–3	4–1	0–0	0–0	1–3	3–2	3–1	—	0–2	—	—	—	1–1	1–0	—	0–0	3–0	1–3	—
Crusaders	1–0	9–0	0–3	0–2	—	2–0	2–0	1–1	0–3	0–1	1–1	1–1	—	2–0	—	1–1	—	—	2–0	1–2	0–2	—	—	—
Dungannon Swifts	0–1	2–3	1–4	2–2	1–4	—	3–1	1–2	0–0	2–3	1–2	4–1	—	—	3–1	—	2–2	—	—	0–3	0–2	—	—	5–0
Glenavon	1–0	2–1	0–1	1–1	1–3	1–0	—	0–1	0–4	0–2	2–0	1–3	0–1	—	—	—	—	4–0	—	0–0	—	2–2	1–2	—
Glentoran	5–0	2–3	1–0	1–2	2–2	0–0	3–1	—	1–2	4–0	6–0	1–0	4–0	2–2	2–2	6–0	—	—	—	—	—	—	0–3	8–2
Larne	3–0	4–1	2–1	2–0	1–1	4–4	4–1	2–1	—	2–0	1–0	4–0	—	2–0	—	—	—	—	6–1	3–0	—	1–1	2–0	3–0
Linfield	4–0	3–3	2–1	2–1	2–0	4–3	4–2	2–0	1–2	—	5–1	6–1	2–0	—	—	—	1–0	1–2	—	2–0	—	—	—	6–0
Loughgall	5–2	3–4	1–4	1–2	1–2	1–2	2–2	0–1	1–0	0–2	—	3–1	—	3–3	2–3	—	0–1	2–1	—	—	—	1–2	—	0–0
Newry City	0–0	0–1	0–3	0–2	0–4	2–2	0–3	2–4	1–2	0–3	0–3	—	1–1	—	1–2	0–2	0–1	—	0–4	—	—	—	—	—

Source: Northern Ireland Football League, Soccerway
Legend: Blue = home team win; Yellow = draw; Red = away team win.
For upcoming matches, an "a" indicates there is an article about the rivalry between the two participants.

=== Matches 34–38 ===
For the final five matches, the table splits into two halves, with the top six teams forming Section A and the bottom six teams forming Section B. Each team plays every other team in their respective section once. The fixtures are reversed from those played during rounds 23–33, ensuring that teams have played every other team in their respective section twice at home and twice away overall throughout the season.

==== Section A ====
Home \ Away	CLF	COL	CRU	GLT	LAR	LIN
Cliftonville	—	—	—	2–0	—	—
Coleraine	2–2	—	0–2	2–1	—	—
Crusaders	2–1	—	—	—	—	1–2
Glentoran	—	—	4–0	—	1–2	0–0
Larne	8–1	5–0	0–1	—	—	—
Linfield	1–1	2–2	—	—	1–1	—

Source: Northern Ireland Football League, Soccerway
Legend: Blue = home team win; Yellow = draw; Red = away team win.
For upcoming matches, an "a" indicates there is an article about the rivalry between the two participants.

==== Section B ====
Home \ Away	BYM	CRK	DUN	GLA	LGL	NEW
Ballymena United	—	—	—	1–0	—	4–0
Carrick Rangers	2–1	—	—	—	2–1	—
Dungannon Swifts	3–0	3–2	—	2–0	2–0	—
Glenavon	—	1–2	—	—	—	3–2
Loughgall	2–3	—	—	3–1	—	—
Newry City	—	1–3	0–2	—	1–4	—

Source: Northern Ireland Football League, Soccerway
Legend: Blue = home team win; Yellow = draw; Red = away team win.
For upcoming matches, an "a" indicates there is an article about the rivalry between the two participants.

== Play-offs ==
=== Conference League play-offs ===
Clubs placed 3rd–7th compete for the second and final place in the 2024–25 Conference League first qualifying round. The play-offs are one-off matches, with the higher-ranked teams given home advantage and extra time and penalties used to determine the winner if necessary. Since the 2023–24 Irish Cup winners finished in the top three, the 3rd-placed team qualified automatically for the Conference League and the spot was vacated.

==== Semi-finals ====
1 May 2024	Crusaders (4th)	3–1	Carrick Rangers (7th)	Belfast
19:45	Lecky 7', 54'; Nixon 45+1'		Gibson 45+3'	Stadium: Seaview

1 May 2024	Glentoran (5th)	0–3	Coleraine (6th)	Belfast
19:45			McGonigle 21', 70'; Kane 45+5'	Stadium: The Oval

==== Final ====
6 May 2024	Crusaders (4th)	3–2	Coleraine (6th)	Belfast
15:00	O'Rourke 36'; Larmour 38'; Forsythe 90+1'		McGonigle 5'; Carson 70'	Stadium: Seaview

=== NIFL Premiership play-off ===
The eleventh-placed club (Ballymena United) faced the second-placed club from the 2023–24 NIFL Championship (Institute) in a two-legged play-off for the final place in the following season's Premiership.

==== First leg ====
30 April 2024	Institute	1–0	Ballymena United	Derry
15:00	Lafferty 58'			Stadium: Ryan McBride Brandywell Stadium

==== Second leg ====
3 May 2024	Ballymena United	2–0 (2–1 agg.)	Institute	Ballymena
15:00	McCullough 78'; McCurry 87'			Stadium: Ballymena Showgrounds

== Attendances ==
#	Football club	Home games	Average attendance
1	Linfield	19	3,212
2	Coleraine	19	2,468
3	Glentoran	19	2,451
4	Larne	19	2,013
5	Cliftonville	19	1,918
6	Crusaders	19	1,634
7	Ballymena United	19	1,296
8	Glenavon	19	968
9	Newry City	19	869
10	Loughgall	19	748
11	Carrick Rangers	19	709
12	Dungannon Swifts	19	689
