= 2021–22 NIFL Championship =

NIFL Championship
- Season: 2021–22
- Dates: 7 Aug 2021 – 30 Apr 2022
- Champions: Newry City
- Promoted: Newry City
- Relegated: Queen's University
- Matches played: 228
- Goals scored: 720 (3.16 per match)
- Biggest home win: Loughgall 12–1 Annagh United (30 April 2022)
- Biggest away win: Knockbreda 1–6 Loughgall (11 September 2021)
- Highest scoring: Loughgall 12–1 Annagh United (30 April 2022)

The 2021–22 NIFL Championship (known as the Lough 41 Championship for sponsorship reasons) was the fifth season of the NIFL Championship since gaining senior status. It is the second-tier of the Northern Ireland Football League - the national football league in Northern Ireland. The season began on 7 August 2021 and concluded on 30 April 2022.

The Championship returned after a one-year hiatus, following the cancellation of the 2020–21 season due to the COVID-19 pandemic in Northern Ireland.

Portadown were the champions from the 2019–20 season. However, as they won promotion to the 2020–21 NIFL Premiership before the COVID-19 hiatus, they could not defend their title. Newry City were confirmed as champions on the final day of the 2021–22 season.

== Teams ==
Locations of the 2021–22 NIFL Championship teams
Locations of the Belfast-based 2021–22 NIFL Championship teams

The 2021–22 NIFL Championship was contested by 12 teams, ten of which retained their Championship status from the 2019–20 season. Portadown were champions in the previous season, and were promoted to the 2020–21 NIFL Premiership. They were replaced by the bottom team in the NIFL Premiership, Institute. Runners-up Ballinamallard United missed out on promotion, as the NIFL Premiership play-off was cancelled as a result of the COVID-19 pandemic in Northern Ireland.

The bottom Championship team from the previous season, PSNI, were relegated to the third-tier NIFL Premier Intermediate League. They were replaced by Annagh United, winners of the Premier Intermediate League. The eleventh-placed Championship team from the previous season, Knockbreda, had a reprieve, as the NIFL Championship play-off was cancelled as a result of the COVID-19 pandemic in Northern Ireland.

=== Stadia and locations ===
Club	Stadium	Location	Capacity
Annagh United	Tandragee Road	Portadown	1,250 (100 seated)
Ards	Bangor Fuels Arena	Bangor	1,895 (500 seated)
Ballinamallard United	Ferney Park	Ballinamallard	2,000 (250 seated)
Ballyclare Comrades	Dixon Park	Ballyclare	5,333
Dergview	Darragh Park	Castlederg	1,200
Dundela	Wilgar Park	Belfast	2,500
Harland & Wolff Welders	Tillysburn Park	Belfast	3,000
Institute	Ryan McBride Brandywell Stadium	Derry	8,200
Knockbreda	Breda Park	Belfast	1,000
Loughgall	Lakeview Park	Loughgall	3,000
Newry City	The Showgrounds	Newry	2,275 (1,080 seated)
Queen's University	Upper Malone	Belfast	1,000 (330 seated)

== League table ==
Pos	Team	Pld	W	D	L	GF	GA	GD	Pts	Promotion, qualification or relegation (Note: Teams played each other three times (33 matches), before the league was split into two groups (the top six and the bottom six).)
1	Newry City (C, P)	38	22	7	9	69	32	+37	73	Promotion to the NIFL Premiership
2	Annagh United	38	20	7	11	73	64	+9	67	Qualification for the NIFL Premiership play-off
3	Loughgall	38	19	6	13	68	41	+27	63	
4	Ballinamallard United	38	17	9	12	69	56	+13	60	
5	Harland & Wolff Welders	38	18	5	15	62	57	+5	59	
6	Dergview	38	14	13	11	57	52	+5	55	
7	Ards	38	16	7	15	64	55	+9	55	
8	Dundela	38	15	8	15	65	56	+9	53	
9	Institute	38	13	6	19	44	71	−27	45	
10	Ballyclare Comrades	38	11	9	18	51	72	−21	42	
11	Knockbreda (O)	38	8	10	20	61	94	−33	34	Qualification for the NIFL Championship play-off
12	Queen's University (R)	38	8	7	23	37	70	−33	31	Relegation to the NIFL Premier Intermediate League

Source: NIFL Championship
Rules for classification: 1) Points; 2) Goal difference; 3) Number of goals scored; 4) Head-to-head points; 5) Head-to-head goal difference; 6) Drawing of lots
(C) Champions; (O) Play-off winners; (P) Promoted; (R) Relegated

== Results ==
=== Matches 1–22 ===
During matches 1–22 each team played every other team twice (home and away).

Home \ Away	ANN	ARD	BMD	BCC	DGV	DUN	HAR	INS	KNB	LGL	NEW	QUE
Annagh United	—	2–3	2–4	5–1	3–1	5–2	0–1	2–2	4–1	3–0	0–3	4–3
Ards	0–2	—	3–1	3–0	1–2	2–0	1–0	1–1	1–1	3–1	1–1	3–0
Ballinamallard United	1–0	1–1	—	1–0	1–1	2–2	1–2	4–0	2–0	0–0	0–2	3–0
Ballyclare Comrades	1–2	2–4	5–1	—	3–1	1–0	1–0	0–0	2–2	0–2	1–0	0–2
Dergview	0–2	1–1	2–0	1–2	—	2–0	1–2	5–0	3–3	1–0	0–2	3–1
Dundela	1–3	2–0	1–3	3–0	1–2	—	4–0	4–0	3–4	0–2	2–2	1–2
Harland & Wolff Welders	2–3	2–1	5–3	2–2	3–1	1–2	—	2–0	1–1	1–2	1–2	1–2
Institute	0–2	2–1	1–2	1–3	1–1	2–1	0–1	—	1–3	0–2	1–2	0–1
Knockbreda	3–3	2–3	2–4	3–2	3–2	3–3	0–1	2–2	—	1–6	0–2	3–1
Loughgall	0–1	1–0	3–3	1–1	2–1	3–0	4–0	0–2	1–2	—	1–3	0–0
Newry City	2–0	2–1	0–3	0–1	1–2	1–1	3–2	5–1	3–0	1–1	—	0–0
Queen's University	0–2	2–1	0–2	1–3	2–2	0–0	0–5	0–1	2–3	0–1	0–2	—

Source: NIFL Championship
Legend: Blue = home team win; Yellow = draw; Red = away team win.
For upcoming matches, an "a" indicates there is an article about the rivalry between the two participants.

=== Matches 23–33 ===
During matches 23–33 each team played every other team for the third time (either at home, or away).

Home \ Away	ANN	ARD	BMD	BCC	DGV	DUN	HAR	INS	KNB	LGL	NEW	QUE
Annagh United	—	—	1–2	1–4	0–0	—	1–1	—	—	0–0	—	—
Ards	0–1	—	—	5–0	—	1–3	—	—	5–2	—	—	2–0
Ballinamallard United	—	2–1	—	—	1–2	—	0–3	—	3–1	—	—	5–0
Ballyclare Comrades	—	—	2–2	—	—	—	—	1–2	—	0–3	1–5	1–1
Dergview	—	2–2	—	2–0	—	—	—	3–1	—	3–0	0–2	0–0
Dundela	0–2	—	1–1	3–0	2–2	—	—	—	—	3–0	—	2–0
Harland & Wolff Welders	—	4–0	—	2–1	1–2	2–3	—	2–1	—	—	—	—
Institute	5–1	0–3	2–1	—	—	0–3	—	—	—	2–3	0–0	—
Knockbreda	0–3	—	—	2–2	1–1	1–2	1–2	2–3	—	—	—	—
Loughgall	—	2–3	2–0	—	—	—	3–0	—	4–1	—	1–0	—
Newry City	0–3	4–0	2–0	—	—	1–0	1–2	—	5–1	—	—	—
Queen's University	2–4	—	—	—	—	—	1–2	0–1	3–1	2–1	0–1	—

Source: NIFL Championship
Legend: Blue = home team win; Yellow = draw; Red = away team win.
For upcoming matches, an "a" indicates there is an article about the rivalry between the two participants.

=== Matches 34–38 ===
For the final five matches the table split into two halves, with teams ranked 1st–6th in Section A and teams ranked 7th–12th in Section B. During matches 34–38 each team played every other team in their respective section once. The fixtures were reversed from those played during rounds 23–33, ensuring that teams had played every other team in their respective section twice at home and twice away overall throughout the season.

==== Top six ====
Home \ Away	ANN	BMD	DGV	HAR	LGL	NEW
Annagh United	—	—	—	—	—	1–1
Ballinamallard United	5–2	—	—	—	1–2	1–0
Dergview	0–0	1–1	—	2–2	—	—
Harland & Wolff Welders	1–2	2–2	—	—	1–0	0–3
Loughgall	12–1	—	0–1	—	—	—
Newry City	—	—	5–1	—	0–2	—

Source: NIFL
Legend: Blue = home team win; Yellow = draw; Red = away team win.

==== Bottom six ====
Home \ Away	ARD	BCC	DUN	INS	KNB	QUE
Ards	—	—	—	0–1	—	—
Ballyclare Comrades	0–1	—	2–1	—	3–3	—
Dundela	2–2	—	—	4–1	1–0	—
Institute	—	2–1	—	—	2–1	3–2
Knockbreda	2–1	—	—	—	—	0–2
Queen's University	2–3	2–2	1–2	—	—	—

Source: NIFL
Legend: Blue = home team win; Yellow = draw; Red = away team win.

== NIFL Championship play-off ==
The eleventh-placed club, Knockbreda, faced the second-placed club from the 2021–22 NIFL Premier Intermediate League, Bangor, for one place in the following season's Championship.

10 May 2022
19:45 BST
First leg

Bangor	2–2	Knockbreda

Clandeboye Park, Bangor

14 May 2022
14:00 BST
Second leg

Knockbreda	2–0	Bangor

Breda Park, Belfast

Knockbreda won 4–2 on aggregate.

== Season statistics ==
=== Top scorers ===
Rank	Player	Club	Goals
1	(Republic of Ireland) B.J Banda	Ballinamallard United	16
2	(Nigeria) Benny Igiehon	Dergview	14
2	(Scotland) Michael McLellan	H&W Welders	14
4	(Lithuania) Nedas Maciulaitis	Loughgall	13
5	(Northern Ireland) Joshua McIlwaine	Ballinamallard United	10
5	(Northern Ireland) Ruairi McDonald	Annagh United	10
7	(Northern Ireland) Daniel Hughes	Newry City	9
