= 2023–24 NIFL Championship =

NIFL Championship
- Season: 2023–24
- Dates: 5 Aug 2023 – 26 Apr 2024
- Champions: Portadown
- Promoted: Portadown
- Relegated: Dergview; Knockbreda

The 2023–24 NIFL Championship (known as the Playr-Fit Championship for sponsorship reasons) was the seventh season of the NIFL Championship (the second-tier of the Irish League - the national football league in Northern Ireland) since gaining senior status. The season began on 5 August 2023 and concluded on 26 April 2024.

The champions (Portadown) were promoted to the 2024–25 NIFL Premiership. The runners-up (Institute) qualified for the NIFL Premiership play-off, losing and remaining in the league. The eleventh-placed team (Dergview) qualified for the NIFL Championship play-off, losing and being relegated to the 2024–25 NIFL Premier Intermediate League alongside the bottom-placed team (Knockbreda).

== Teams ==
The league consisted of twelve teams; ten teams remaining from the previous season, one team promoted from the NIFL Premier Intermediate League, and one team relegated from the NIFL Premiership. Bangor were promoted to the league as champions of the 2022–23 NIFL Premier Intermediate League (replacing the second-placed 2023–24 NIFL Championship team Warrenpoint Town, who were relegated after being refused a NIFL Championship license). Portadown were relegated to the league as the bottom-placed team of the 2022–23 NIFL Premiership (replacing the 2022–23 NIFL Championship promoted team Loughgall).

Locations of the 2023–24 NIFL Championship teams
Locations of the Belfast-based 2023–24 NIFL Championship teams

=== Stadia and locations ===
Club	Stadium	Location	Capacity
Annagh United	Tandragee Road	Portadown	1,250 (100 seated)
Ards	Bangor Fuels Arena	Bangor	1,895 (500 seated)
Ballinamallard United	Ferney Park	Ballinamallard	2,000 (250 seated)
Ballyclare Comrades	Dixon Park	Ballyclare	5,333
Bangor	Clandeboye Park	Bangor	1,895 (500 seated)
Dergview	Darragh Park	Castlederg	1,200
Dundela	Wilgar Park	Belfast	2,500
Harland & Wolff Welders	Tillysburn Park	Belfast	3,000
Institute	Ryan McBride Brandywell Stadium	Derry	8,200
Knockbreda	Breda Park	Belfast	1,000
Newington	Solitude	Belfast	8,000 (3,000 seated)
Portadown	Shamrock Park	Portadown	3,940 (2,765 seated)

== League table ==
Pos	Team	Pld	W	D	L	GF	GA	GD	Pts	Promotion, qualification or relegation (Note: Teams played each other three times (33 matches), before the league was split into two groups (the top six and the bottom six).)
1	Portadown (C, P)	38	22	5	11	74	53	+21	71	Promotion to NIFL Premiership
2	Institute	38	20	9	9	60	43	+17	69	Qualification for the NIFL Premiership play-off
3	Bangor	38	20	8	10	77	44	+33	68	
4	Annagh United	38	20	8	10	61	50	+11	68	
5	Dundela	38	21	4	13	74	60	+14	67	
6	Harland & Wolff Welders	38	17	5	16	70	63	+7	56	
7	Ballyclare Comrades	38	18	7	13	73	60	+13	61	
8	Newington	38	16	4	18	65	68	−3	52	
9	Ballinamallard United	38	15	6	17	51	51	0	51	
10	Ards	38	9	10	19	60	69	−9	37	
11	Dergview (R)	38	6	9	23	41	79	−38	27	Qualification for the NIFL Championship play-off
12	Knockbreda (R)	38	5	3	30	34	100	−66	18	Relegation to NIFL Premier Intermediate League

Source: NIFL Championship
Rules for classification: 1) Points; 2) Goal difference; 3) Number of goals scored; 4) Head-to-head points; 5) Head-to-head goal difference; 6) Drawing of lots
(C) Champions; (P) Promoted; (R) Relegated

== Results ==
=== Matches 1–33 ===
For matches 1–22, each team plays every other team twice (home and away). For matches 23–33, each team plays every other team for the third time (either at home or away).

Home \ Away	ANN	ARD	BMD	BCC	BAG	DGV	DUN	HAR	INS	KNB	NEW	POR	ANN	ARD	BMD	BCC	BAG	DGV	DUN	HAR	INS	KNB	NEW	POR
Annagh United	—	0–0	0–0	2–1	0–4	3–0	5–2	2–1	1–1	2–0	0–3	3–1	—	2–0	—	—	—	—	4–0	4–3	0–0	—	2–0	2–2
Ards	2–3	—	2–2	2–2	2–2	4–2	4–0	1–1	2–3	1–1	1–3	1–2	—	—	0–1	—	—	2–0	—	0–1	2–2	1–2	—	1–3
Ballinamallard United	2–0	1–1	—	1–0	0–3	4–2	0–0	1–2	0–1	3–0	1–2	3–0	1–0	—	—	—	0–4	—	—	4–0	0–0	6–1	—	1–2
Ballyclare Comrades	0–0	6–3	2–1	—	3–2	2–2	0–1	3–1	1–3	3–0	3–0	2–1	2–2	3–0	3–1	—	2–3	—	—	1–4	—	—	2–0	—
Bangor	3–1	1–0	0–3	4–0	—	3–0	1–2	1–1	1–1	4–1	2–1	2–2	2–1	3–1	—	—	—	—	3–0	—	0–1	5–0	—	—
Dergview	0–1	0–3	1–0	1–3	2–1	—	0–1	0–5	2–2	5–0	2–1	2–3	0–1	—	0–0	1–1	1–1	—	—	0–2	—	—	—	—
Dundela	6–2	0–1	2–1	4–0	3–2	3–2	—	2–1	1–2	3–1	4–2	2–0	—	4–0	1–0	1–1	—	5–1	—	—	—	—	—	1–1
Harland & Wolff Welders	2–0	0–3	4–2	4–2	0–0	2–3	2–1	—	4–1	2–1	2–2	1–0	—	—	—	—	1–2	—	2–1	—	0–1	4–1	3–1	1–2
Institute	1–3	3–2	1–0	1–0	4–0	2–0	1–2	2–1	—	2–0	1–3	1–0	—	—	—	3–0	—	0–0	2–4	—	—	—	2–0	1–2
Knockbreda	0–1	2–3	1–2	2–4	1–5	2–0	1–3	2–1	1–4	—	1–3	0–2	1–4	—	—	2–0	—	1–2	0–1	—	0–3	—	—	—
Newington	3–0	4–1	1–3	1–2	2–1	3–2	3–1	0–2	2–1	2–0	—	0–2	—	1–0	1–2	—	1–3	3–0	1–3	—	—	2–2	—	—
Portadown	4–1	4–2	2–0	2–1	0–1	4–1	1–3	5–2	1–0	3–1	5–1	—	—	—	—	2–2	2–1	3–2	—	—	—	2–0	0–4	—

Source: NIFL Championship
Legend: Blue = home team win; Yellow = draw; Red = away team win.
For upcoming matches, an "a" indicates there is an article about the rivalry between the two participants.

=== Matches 34–38 ===
For the final five matches, the table splits into two halves, with the top six teams forming Section A and the bottom six teams forming Section B. Each team plays every other team in their respective section once. The fixtures are reversed from those played during rounds 23–33, ensuring that teams have played every other team in their respective section twice at home and twice away overall throughout the season.

==== Section A ====
Home \ Away	ANN	BAG	DUN	HAR	INS	POR
Annagh United	—	0–0	—	—	—	—
Bangor	—	—	—	3–0	—	0–3
Dundela	0–1	1–3	—	2–3	3–4	—
Harland & Wolff Welders	1–2	—	—	—	—	—
Institute	0–2	1–1	—	2–2	—	—
Portadown	2–4	—	1–1	3–1	0–1	—

Source: NIFL Championship
Legend: Blue = home team win; Yellow = draw; Red = away team win.
For upcoming matches, an "a" indicates there is an article about the rivalry between the two participants.

==== Section B ====
Home \ Away	ARD	BMD	BCC	DGV	KNB	NEW
Ards	—	—	1–2	—	—	1–1
Ballinamallard United	0–5	—	0–4	2–0	—	3–1
Ballyclare Comrades	—	—	—	2–1	4–0	—
Dergview	2–2	—	—	—	1–1	1–1
Knockbreda	0–3	2–0	—	—	—	3–4
Newington	—	—	2–4	—	—	—

Source: NIFL Championship
Legend: Blue = home team win; Yellow = draw; Red = away team win.
For upcoming matches, an "a" indicates there is an article about the rivalry between the two participants.

== NIFL Championship play-off ==
The eleventh-placed club (Dergview) faced the second-placed club from the 2023–24 NIFL Premier Intermediate League (Armagh City) in a two-legged play-off for the final place in the following season's Championship.

=== First leg ===
30 April 2024	Armagh City	1–1	Dergview	Armagh
20:00	McConnell 69'		Walsh 34'	Stadium: Holm Park

=== Second leg ===
3 May 2024	Dergview	1–1 (a.e.t.) (2–2 agg.) (4–5 p)	Armagh City	Castlederg
20:00	Lynch 111' (pen.)		Mullen 107'	Stadium: Darragh Park
	Penalties
	Penalty scored Penalty missed		Penalty missed Penalty scored
