= 2025–26 NIFL Premier Intermediate League =

2025-26 NIFL Premier Intermediate League

NIFL Premier Intermediate League
- Season: 2025–26
- Dates: 24 August 2025 – 25 April 2026
- Champions: Moyola Park
- Promoted: Moyola Park; Newry City; Rathfriland Rangers; Strabane Athletic

The 2025–26 NIFL Premier Intermediate League (known as the Playr-Fit Premier Intermediate League for sponsorship reasons) was the ninth season of the NIFL Premier Intermediate League (the third tier of the Northern Ireland Football League - the national football league in Northern Ireland).

== Teams ==
Locations of the 2025–26 NIFL Premier Intermediate teams
Locations of the 2026–27 NCL Premier teams based in Belfast and Lisburn

The league consisted of fourteen teams; eleven teams remaining from the previous season, one team promoted from Level 4, and two teams relegated from the NIFL Championship. The competition consists of a full double round robin of twenty-six matches.

The promoted team was the 2024–25 NIFL Premier Intermediate League play-off winners Strabane Athletic. They replaced the 2024–25 NIFL Premier Intermediate League bottom placed team Tobermore United.

The relegated teams were the 2024–25 NIFL Championship play-off losers Ballyclare Comrades and bottom-placed team Newry City. They replaced the 2024–25 NIFL Championship champions Warrenpoint Town and play-off winners Queen's University.

With the NIFL Championship expanding to sixteen teams from the following season, this was the first season where the top four teams of the NIFL Premier Intermediate League were promoted to the NIFL Championship.

Club	Stadium	Location	Capacity
Ballyclare Comrades	Dixon Park	Ballyclare	2398 (538 seated)
Ballymacash Rangers	The Bluebell Stadium	Lisburn	1,280
Banbridge Town	Crystal Park	Banbridge	1,500
Coagh United	Hagan Park	Coagh	1,000 (150 seated)
Dergview	Darragh Park	Castlederg	1,280
Dollingstown	Planter's Park	Dollingstown	1,000
Knockbreda	Breda Park	Belfast	1,000
Lisburn Distillery	New Grosvenor Stadium	Lisburn	1,500 (790 seated)
Moyola Park	Fortwilliam Park	Tobermore	2,000 (100 seated)
Newry City	The Showgrounds	Newry	2,275
Oxford Sunnyside	Knockramer Park	Lurgan	1,600
Portstewart	Mullaghacall	Portstewart	1,000
Rathfriland Rangers	Iveagh Park	Rathfriland	1,000
Strabane Athletic	Melvin Sports Arena	Strabane	1,000

== League table ==
Pos	Team	Pld	W	D	L	GF	GA	GD	Pts	Promotion
1	Moyola Park (C, P)	26	16	4	6	69	25	+44	52	Promotion to the NIFL Championship
2	Strabane Athletic (P)	26	15	4	7	48	37	+11	49	Promotion to the NIFL Championship
3	Rathfriland Rangers (P)	26	15	3	8	60	29	+31	48	Promotion to the NIFL Championship
4	Newry City (P)	26	14	5	7	40	30	+10	47	Promotion to the NIFL Championship
5	Dollingstown	26	14	4	8	66	48	+18	46	
6	Ballymacash Rangers	26	15	1	10	61	46	+15	46	
7	Portstewart	26	10	7	9	39	36	+3	37	
8	Oxford Sunnyside	26	11	3	12	52	46	+6	36	
9	Dergview	26	10	6	10	46	47	−1	36	
10	Ballyclare Comrades	26	11	3	12	43	45	−2	36	
11	Knockbreda	26	7	7	12	31	43	−12	28	
12	Coagh United	26	7	6	13	34	53	−19	27	
13	Lisburn Distillery	26	7	4	15	43	60	−17	25	
14	Banbridge Town	26	1	1	24	16	103	−87	−8 (Note: Banbridge Town were deducted twelve points for two rule breaches.)	

Source: NIFL Premier Intermediate
Rules for classification: 1) Points per game; 2) Goal difference; 3) Number of goals scored; 4) Head-to-head points; 5) Head-to-head goal difference; 6) Drawing of lots
(C) Champions; (P) Promoted

== Results ==
Each team plays every other team twice (home and away).

Home \ Away	BCC	BAL	BAN	COA	DER	DOL	KNO	LIS	MOY	NEW	OXF	POR	RAT	STR
Ballyclare Comrades	—	1–6	5–0	4–0	3–1	3–4	4–1	1–0	1–1	2–0	2–1	1–1	3–1	0–2
Ballymacash Rangers	0–1	—	8–1	1–1	2–0	2–4	1–2	3–2	4–3	3–1	0–4	2–1	1–2	3–1
Banbridge Town	1–2	1–4	—	1–4	0–0	0–3	0–2	2–4	3–2	0–3	1–3	0–4	0–4	0–1
Coagh United	3–1	0–1	4–0	—	2–1	3–3	0–1	1–3	0–3	0–1	2–1	0–1	1–3	4–1
Dergview	3–1	2–6	2–1	2–2	—	2–3	3–0	2–1	1–0	2–3	5–1	2–2	0–1	0–0
Dollingstown	0–3	3–1	10–0	2–3	1–3	—	2–1	2–2	3–2	0–1	2–0	4–0	2–1	3–2
Knockbreda	1–0	0–3	4–0	0–0	3–0	3–3	—	2–2	0–1	2–0	0–0	1–1	0–4	0–1
Lisburn Distillery	2–0	1–3	1–0	6–0	1–3	2–1	3–3	—	1–2	0–3	0–2	0–1	1–2	1–5
Moyola Park	3–1	7–1	10–1	4–1	4–0	4–2	3–0	6–0	—	0–0	2–0	4–0	2–1	4–1
Newry City	2–0	2–1	2–1	0–0	3–3	4–3	2–1	4–3	0–0	—	3–0	3–0	0–0	0–1
Oxford Sunnyside	5–2	0–1	4–3	5–0	2–4	2–3	3–2	5–0	2–0	4–0	—	2–1	2–5	1–2
Portstewart	4–1	4–2	5–0	1–1	0–1	1–1	4–0	2–1	0–0	2–1	1–1	—	0–4	2–0
Rathfriland Rangers	1–1	0–1	9–0	4–1	3–2	0–1	1–1	1–2	0–1	2–1	4–1	2–0	—	2–5
Strabane Athletic	2–0	2–1	3–0	3–1	2–2	3–1	2–1	4–4	2–1	0–1	1–1	2–1	0–3	—

Source: NIFL Premier Intermediate
Legend: Blue = home team win; Yellow = draw; Red = away team win.
For upcoming matches, an "a" indicates there is an article about the rivalry between the two participants.
