= 2021–22 NIFL Premier Intermediate League =

NIFL Premier Intermediate League
- Season: 2021–22
- Dates: 17 Aug 2021 – 7 May 2022
- Champions: Newington
- Promoted: Newington
- Matches played: 72
- Goals scored: 218 (3.03 per match)

Locations of the 2021–22 NIFL Premier Intermediate teams
Locations of the Belfast-based 2021–22 NIFL Premier Intermediate teams

The 2021–22 NIFL Premier Intermediate League (known as the Lough 41 Premier Intermediate League for sponsorship reasons) was the fifth season of the NIFL Premier Intermediate League, the third tier of the Northern Ireland Football League - the national football league in Northern Ireland.

The Premier Intermediate League returned after a one-year hiatus, following the cancellation of the 2020–21 season due to the COVID-19 pandemic in Northern Ireland. Annagh United were the reigning champions from the 2019–20 season, and were promoted to the NIFL Championship. The season began on 17 August 2021 and concluded on 7 May 2022.

== Teams ==
Club	Stadium	Location	Capacity
Armagh City	Holm Park	Armagh	2,000
Banbridge Town	Crystal Park	Banbridge	1,500
Bangor	Clandeboye Park	Bangor	1,895 (500 seated)
Dollingstown	Planter's Park	Dollingstown	1,000
Limavady United	The Showgrounds	Limavady	1,500 (274 seated)
Lisburn Distillery	New Grosvenor Stadium	Ballyskeagh	7,000 (540 seated)
Moyola Park	Mill Meadow	Castledawson	1,000
Newington	Solitude	Belfast	3,054 (all seated)
Portstewart	Mullaghacall	Portstewart	1,000
PSNI	The Dub	Belfast	1,000 (330 seated)
Tobermore United	Fortwilliam Park	Tobermore	2,000 (100 seated)

== League table ==
Pos	Team	Pld	W	D	L	GF	GA	GD	Pts	Promotion, qualification or relegation (Note: Teams played each other twice (20 matches), before the league was split into two groups (the top six and the bottom five).)
1	Newington (C, P)	25	18	3	4	67	28	+39	57	Promotion to the NIFL Championship
2	Bangor	25	16	2	7	48	27	+21	50	Qualification for the NIFL Championship play-off
3	Armagh City	25	14	4	7	48	34	+14	46	
4	Limavady United	25	13	4	8	47	27	+20	43	
5	Banbridge Town	25	12	5	8	28	25	+3	41	
6	Dollingstown	25	12	4	9	46	34	+12	40	
7	Portstewart	24	10	2	12	42	28	+14	32	
8	Lisburn Distillery	24	10	2	12	38	39	−1	32	
9	Moyola Park	24	4	8	12	31	54	−23	20	
10	PSNI	24	5	1	18	27	72	−45	16	
11	Tobermore United	24	0	7	17	16	70	−54	7	

Rules for classification: 1) Points per game; 2) Goal difference; 3) Number of goals scored; 4) Head-to-head points; 5) Head-to-head goal difference; 6) Drawing of lots
(C) Champions; (P) Promoted

== Results ==
=== Matches 1–20 ===
During matches 1–20 each team played every other team twice (home and away).

Home \ Away	ARM	BAB	BAG	DOL	LIM	LIS	MOY	NEW	POR	PSN	TOB
Armagh City	—	1–2		6–1			5–1	2–1	3–1	5–1	
Banbridge Town		—									
Bangor			—								
Dollingstown	0–2		1–4	—		2–0	1–2	0–1	2–0	2–0	5–0
Limavady United	3–4				—	2–1			2–0		3–0
Lisburn Distillery	1–0		0–2			—	0–0			2–1	
Moyola Park		1–0			0–3	1–4	—		2–0	9–2	
Newington	2–2		2–3		2–0			—		7–0	
Portstewart			0–1	6–1	0–1				—		0–0
PSNI		2–1			1–2	0–3				—	0–0
Tobermore United		0–0	0–1		1–2		1–1	1–3	1–1		—

Source: Premier Intermediate
Legend: Blue = home team win; Yellow = draw; Red = away team win.
For upcoming matches, an "a" indicates there is an article about the rivalry between the two participants.
