= Peter McCann (footballer, born 1981) =

Irish footballer (born 1981)

Personal information
- Date of birth: 18 August 1981 (age 45)
- Place of birth: Northern Ireland
- Positions: Defender; midfielder; winger

Team information
- Current team: Oxford Sunnyside

Youth career
- Blackburn Rovers

Senior career*
Years	Team	Apps	(Gls)
2001–2005	Portadown		
2005–2007	Glentoran		
2007–2010	Lisburn Distillery		
2010–2011	Newry City		
2011–2012	Glenavon		
2012–2013	Donegal Celtic		
2016–2018	Rathfriland Rangers		
2018–2020	Lurgan Celtic		
2020–	Oxford Sunnyside		
- * Club domestic league appearances and goals

Peter McCann (born 18 August 1981) is a Northern Irish footballer who plays as a defender, midfielder, or winger for Oxford Sunnyside.

== Career ==
In 2001, McCann signed for Northern Irish side Portadown. He won the Irish League title with the club in the 2001–02 season, and was named Northern Ireland Football Writers' Young Player of the Year for that season. He also finished as league runner-up with Portadown in 2003–04, after needing a final-day win against Glenavon to take the title.

In 2005, he signed for Northern Irish side Glentoran. He was described as "recognised as one of the most talented players in the Irish League" while playing for the club. He made his Glentoran debut in a pre-season friendly as the club prepared for its UEFA Champions League first qualifying round tie against Shelbourne in July 2005.

In 2007, he signed for Northern Irish side Lisburn Distillery, captaining the club under manager Paul Kirk. In 2010, he signed for Northern Irish side Newry City. In 2011, he signed for Northern Irish side Glenavon, where he also served as club captain. In 2012, he signed for Northern Irish side Donegal Celtic. In 2016, he signed for Northern Irish side Rathfriland Rangers, reuniting with manager Paul Kirk, whom he had previously captained at both Lisburn Distillery and Lisburn Rangers. In 2018, he signed for Northern Irish side Lurgan Celtic. In 2020, he signed for Northern Irish side Oxford Sunnyside. He helped the club win the Mid-Ulster Football League Intermediate A title on goal difference from Crewe United, assisting the winning goal in a decisive 1–0 win over Richhill.

== Honours ==
Portadown

- Irish League: 2001–02

Oxford Sunnyside

- Mid-Ulster Football League Intermediate A: c. 2022–23

Individual

- Northern Ireland Football Writers' Young Player of the Year: 2001–02

== Style of play ==
McCann mainly operates as a defender, midfielder, or winger. He is known for his versatility.
