= SAFC (disambiguation) =

The abbreviation SAFC or S.A.F.C. usually refers to Sunderland A.F.C., an English football (soccer) team competing in the English Football League. It may also refer to:

== Other football teams ==
=== United Kingdom ===
- Scarborough Athletic F.C., an English football (soccer) team
- Stirling Albion F.C. a football (soccer) team competing in the Scottish Football League
- Sunderland Albion F.C., a defunct football (soccer) team
- Sutton Athletic F.C., an English non-league football team

=== Elsewhere ===
- San Antonio FC, a soccer team in the (American) United Soccer League, based in Texas
- South Adelaide Football Club, an Australian rules football team competing in the South Australian National Football League
- Strabane Athletic F.C., an association football club in Northern Ireland

== Other uses ==
- Sigma-Aldrich Fine Chemicals, a subdivision of Sigma-Aldrich, an U.S. supplier of chemical materials
- South Australian Film Corporation, a South Australian state government statutory corporation that produces films and promotes the industry
