= Stangmore Park =

Football stadium in Northern Ireland

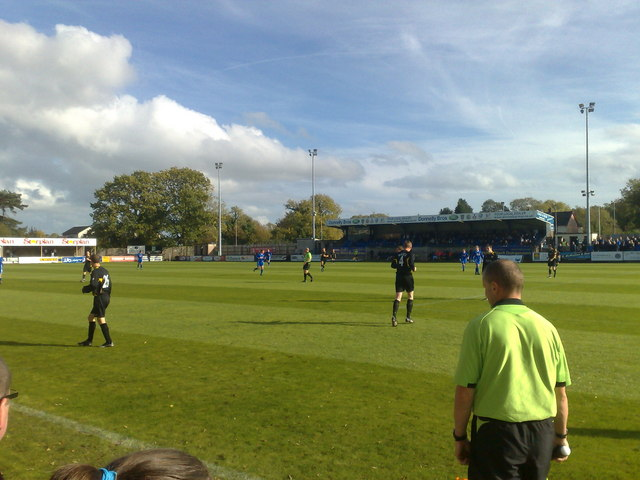
- Stangmore Park
- Interactive map of Stangmore Park
- Full name: Stangmore Park
- Coordinates: 54.4895°N 6.746°W
- Owner: Dungannon Swifts F.C.
- Capacity: 2,000 (300 seats)
- Surface: 3G

Construction
- Groundbreaking: 1975
- Built: 1975
- Opened: 1975

Tenants
- Dungannon Swifts (1975-); Warrenpoint Town (2013)

Stangmore Park is a football stadium in Dungannon, County Tyrone, Northern Ireland. It is the home ground of Dungannon Swifts, and holds around 2,000 spectators, 300 of whom can be seated.

== History ==
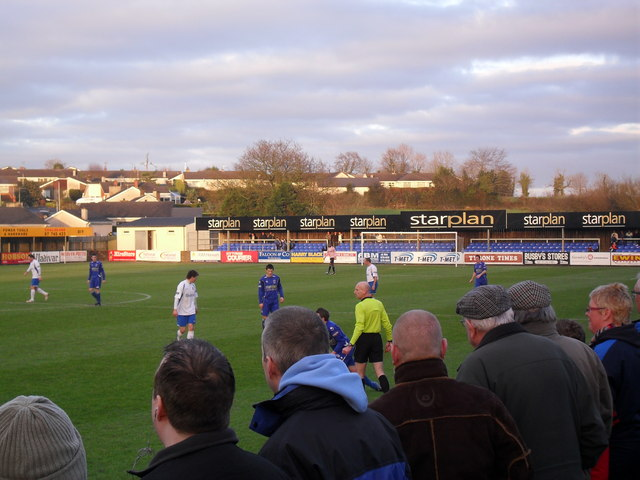
Stangmore Park with the clubhouse in the background

Stangmore Park was opened in 1975 after a temporary wooden social club was built after Dungannon Swifts had bought the land from a local company. In 1982, the wooden social club was removed and replaced with a clubhouse.

In 2006, Stangmore Park was attacked by vandals. Eight crates of beer had been stolen from the ground. The police reported that half of the bottles in the crates had littered the pitch with glass being stuck in the goals and the centre of the pitch. This also led to the postponement of a semi-final of the Bob Radcliffe Cup.

Stangmore Park has often been used as a nominated home ground for teams promoted into the IFA Premiership if their own grounds fail to meet Irish Football Association criteria. In 2012, Ballinamallard United originally nominated Stangmore Park as their home ground after being promoted from the IFA Championship if construction at their Ferney Park ground could not be completed in time for the start of the season. In 2013, Warrenpoint Town also nominated Stangmore Park as their home ground for the first few months of the 2013–14 season as their own home ground, Milltown, was not up to Premiership standard after the IFA refused permission for them to move to The Showgrounds, Newry. During this period, the ground was brought up to Premiership standard. Warrenpoint's final home game at the ground was a 2–1 win over Coleraine on 30 November 2013, after which they moved back to Milltown.

== Usage ==
Stangmore Park is usually used to host Dungannon's home matches. In 2011, it was due to host the Northern Ireland national under-16 football team's match against Poland however the match was moved to Seaview, Belfast due to a waterlogged pitch at Stangmore Park. Although Stangmore Park is primarily used for football, it has also hosted kickboxing.
