= Bob Radcliffe Cup =

- Organiser(s): Mid-Ulster Football Association
- Founded: 1978
- Region: Northern Ireland
- Current champions: Rathfriland Rangers (2025–26)
- Most championships: Loughgall (12 titles)

The Bob Radcliffe Memorial Cup is an intermediate football competition in Northern Ireland run by the Mid-Ulster Football Association. It was introduced in 1978. The competition culminates in the final which has traditionally been played on Boxing Day.

Bob Radcliffe was Treasurer and later Secretary of the Association between the mid 1950s and early 1970s. The cup is named in his honour.

== List of finals ==
Season	Winners	Runners-up
1978–79	Newry Town	Dungannon Swifts
1979–80	Loughgall	Shamrock Rovers
1980–81	Banbridge Town	Newry Town
1981–82	Dungannon Swifts	Cookstown United
1982–83	Portadown Reserves	Milford Everton
1983–84	Portadown Reserves	Banbridge Town
1984–85	Newry Town Reserves	Dungannon Swifts
1985–86	Dungannon Swifts	Newry Celtic
1986–87	Dungannon Swifts	Lurgan United
1987–88	Oxford United	The Guys (Newry)
1988–89	Coagh United	Dungannon Swifts
1989–90	Dungannon Swifts	Banbridge Town
1990–91	Glenavon Reserves	Loughgall
1991–92	Armagh City	Oxford United
1992–93	Dungannon Swifts	Loughgall
1993–94	Dungannon Swifts	Loughgall
1994–95	Dungannon Swifts	Loughgall
1995–96	Dungannon Swifts	Lurgan Celtic
1996–97	Loughgall	Armagh City
1997–98	Lurgan Celtic	
1998–99	Loughgall	Armagh City
1999–00	Loughgall	Lurgan Celtic
2000–01	Tandragee Rovers	Newry Celtic
2001–02	Loughgall	Lurgan Celtic
2002–03	Loughgall	Coagh United
2003–04	Loughgall	Armagh City
2004–05	Armagh City	Coagh United
2005–06	Dungannon Swifts Reserves	Coagh United
2006–07	Coagh United	Banbridge Town
2007–08	Loughgall	Coagh United
2008–09	Loughgall	Killymoon Rangers
2009–10	Loughgall	Banbridge Town
2010–11	Banbridge Town	Rathfriland Rangers
2011–12	Lurgan Celtic	Loughgall
2012–13	Loughgall	Lurgan Celtic
2013–14	Armagh City	Dollingstown
2014–15	Loughgall	Annagh United
2015–16	Armagh City	Loughgall
2016–17	Dollingstown	Coagh United
2017–18	Hanover	Valley Rangers
2018–19	Banbridge Town	Dollingstown
2019–20	Rathfriland Rangers	Dungannon Swifts U20
2020–21	Armagh City	Rathfriland Rangers
2021–22	Dollingstown	Armagh City
2022–23	Oxford Sunnyside	Dollingstown
2023–24	Rathfriland Rangers	Moneyslane
2024–25	Dollingstown	Oxford Sunnyside
2025–26	Rathfriland Rangers	Dollingstown

== Summary of winners ==
Team	Wins
Loughgall	12
Dungannon Swifts	8
Armagh City	5
Rathfriland Rangers	3
Banbridge Town	3
Dollingstown	3
Portadown Reserves	2
Coagh United	2
Lurgan Celtic	2
Oxford Sunnyside‡	2
Dungannon Swifts Reserves	1
Glenavon Reserves	1
Hanover	1
Newry Town	1
Newry Town Reserves	1
Tandragee Rovers	1

‡ Includes one win as Oxford United

== See also ==
- Steel & Sons Cup
- Craig Memorial Cup
- Fermanagh & Western Intermediate Cup
- Mid-Ulster Cup
- Mid-Ulster F.A.
