= Oxford Sunnyside F.C. =

Association football club in Northern Ireland

Oxford Sunnyside FC
- Nickname: The Big O
- Founded: 1960s
- Ground: Knockramer Park
- Capacity: 1,600
- Chairman: Richey Magee
- Manager: Shea Campbell
- League: NCL Premier
- 2025–26: NIFL Premier Intermediate League, 8th of 14
Home colours

Oxford Sunnyside Football Club, is an intermediate-level football club playing in the NCL Premier (former NIFL Premier Intermediate League).

They are based in Lurgan, County Armagh and play their home games at Knockramer Park, In 2011 the club changed its name in to strengthen youth football in Lurgan by connecting with Sunnyside Youth FC. Club colours are white shirts with red shorts.

== History ==
Sunnyside took on NIFL Premiership side Linfield in January 2022 in the Irish Cup, losing 4–0 at Windsor Park.

The club has also regularly challenged at the peak of Mid Ulster league football, and having missed out on promotion to the Northern Ireland Football League through a late goal against Coagh United in the 2022/23 season. The club harbors ambitions to make the step up to the senior game for the first time.

The club would achieve this goal the following season, defeating Strabane Athletic over two legs to secure promotion to the Northern Ireland Football League for the first time.

After promotion to the NIFL Premier Intermediate League (NIFL PIL), Oxford Sunnyside F.C finished 6th & 8th place in the League that included 14 teams.

A new 3g pitch was laid at Knockramer Park during the first half of their entering of the NIFL PIL, with floodlights being installed for the first time at the venue, also. Oxford opened play on the new 3g pitch on the 22 February 2025, with a win over Coagh United. The first night under the floodlights was, 26 February 2025.

Oxford Sunnyside would win notable games, including beating current Premier Intermediate League champions & NIFL Championship bound, Moyola Park 2—0 & a victory of 4—0 over Newry City AFC, who are newly promoted to the NIFL Championship at Knockramer Park.

With changes to the Northern Ireland Football League structure for the 2026–27 season, the NIFL Premier Intermediate League has since been disbanded, and a new NI third tier has emerged under the banner of Northern Amateur Football League– naming it the National Conference League Premier, otherwise known as, (NCL Premier).

Oxford Sunnyside FC have now been selected among the new 12 team League to compete in the NCL Premier. This will begin a new chapter in the clubs history as participants of the inaugural National Conference League. The winner of the NCL Premier, and the runner-up slots will be promoted to the NIFL Championship for the 2027–28 season.

== Current squad ==
Note: Flags indicate national team as defined under FIFA eligibility rules; some limited exceptions apply. Players may hold more than one non-FIFA nationality.

No.	Pos.	Nation	Player
1	GK	NIR	Eoin Hughes
2	DF	NIR	Breandan O'Neill
3	DF	NIR	Aaron Rodgers (Captain)
4	MF	NIR	Jordan Bell
5	DF	NIR	Lennox Camara
6	MF	NIR	Peter McCann
7	FW	NIR	Chris Lavery
9	FW	NIR	Justin Armstrong

No.	Pos.	Nation	Player
11	FW	POR	Marcio Soares
12	DF	NIR	Eoin Morgan
13	GK	IRL	Niall Brady
16	DF	NIR	James McConnville
19	MF	NIR	Liam Toman
20	MF	NIR	Nathan O'Neill
21	DF	NIR	Jude O'Hara (on loan from Larne Olympic)
24	MF	NIR	Dale Malone

== Honours ==
=== Intermediate honours ===
- Mid-Ulster Football League: 2
  - 2022–23, 2023–24
- Bob Radcliffe Cup: 2
  - 1987–88, 2022–23
- Mid-Ulster Intermediate B League: 1
  - 2018–19
- Alan Wilson Cup: 1
  - 2017–18

=== Junior honours ===
- Irish Junior Cup: 7
  - 1981–82, 1983–84, 1987–88, 1988–89, 1992–92, 1994–95, 1997–98 (first team to win a record 7 IFA Junior Cups)
- Mid-Ulster Shield: 8
  - 1982–83, 1983–84, 1989–90, 1990–91, 1991–92, 1992–93, 1993–94, 1994–95
- Mid-Ulster Football League: 13
  - 1980–81, 1981–82, 1983–84, 1984–85, 1986–87, 1987–88, 1988–89, 1989–90, 1990–91, 1991–92, 1992–93, 1993–94, 1994–95
