= Strabane Athletic F.C. =

Association football club in Northern Ireland

Strabane Athletic
- Full name: Strabane Athletic Football Club
- Nickname: SAFC
- Founded: 2010
- Ground: Melvin Sports Complex, Strabane, County Tyrone
- Chairman: Seamus McElroy
- Manager: Mo Mahon
- League: NIFL Championship
- 2025–26: NIFL Premier Intermediate League, 2nd of 14 (promoted)

Strabane Athletic Football Club is a Northern Irish, semi-professional football club based in Strabane, County Tyrone, playing in the NIFL Championship.

== History ==
Strabane Athletic originally started in the Fermanagh and Western League at Junior Level, winning back to back promotions by winning the Third Division during their first season in 2010-11 and the Second Division in 2011-12.

After Strabane then known as Strabane and Sion Swifts United had folding in 2012, the club then switched leagues and joined the Northern Ireland Intermediate League for the 2012-13 season. Taking the place of the now defunct Strabane and Sion Swifts United. This had now elevated the club to intermediate standard

Since the 2013-14 season, Strabane Athletic have been competing in the Irish Cup. Their best performance was in 2018-19 when they reached the Sixth Round losing to Larne Tech Old Boys 3-1.

At the end of the 2022-23 Season the Northern Ireland Intermediate League had folded causing Strabane to switch leagues once more and for the 2023-24 Season Strabane Athletic joined the Ballymena & Provincial Football League and in their first Season they had won the League.

However they would fail to gain promotion to the NIFL Premier Intermediate League by losing the two legged play-off match against the 2023–24 Mid-Ulster Football League champions, Oxford Sunnyside.

In the Following season, Strabane Athletic then won a historic treble by winning the 2024-25 Ballymena & Provincial Football League, O'Gorman Cup and Crawford Cup.

In the same season Strabane Athletic also won the NIFL Premier Intermediate League play-off by beating the 2024–25 Mid-Ulster Football League champions, Crewe United in a two-legged play-off

The following Season, Strabane Athletic had another historic season by finishing 2nd in the NIFL Premier Intermediate League and earning promotion to the NIFL Championship.

In doing so they became the First team from Strabane to reach Senior Football.

Several days after their promotion, Strabane followed up by winning their first Senior honour by beating Limavady United 3-2 to lift the North West Senior Cup.

== Honours ==
=== Senior honours ===
- North West Senior Cup: 1
  - 2025–26,

=== Intermediate honours ===
- Northern Ireland Intermediate League: 1
  - 2018–19
- Ballymena & Provincial Football League: 2
  - 2023–24, 2024-25
- O'Gorman Cup: 1
  - 2024-25
- Crawford Cup: 1
  - 2024-25

=== Junior honours ===
- Fermanagh & Western Division Two: 1
  - 2011-12
- Fermanagh & Western Division Three: 1
  - 2010-11
