= NIFL Championship =

Association football league in Northern Ireland

- Founded: 1951 (Irish League B Division); 2008 (IFA Championship)
- Country: Northern Ireland
- Number of clubs: 16
- Level on pyramid: 2
- Promotion to: NIFL Premiership
- Relegation to: NCL Premier
- Domestic cup: Irish Cup
- League cup: Northern Ireland Football League Cup
- Current champions: Limavady United (3rd title) (2025–26)
- Current: 2026–27 NIFL Championship

The Northern Ireland Football League Championship (known as the Boyle Sports NIFL Championship for sponsorship reasons) is the second level of the Northern Ireland Football League, the national football league in Northern Ireland. Clubs in the Championship can be promoted to the highest national division – the NIFL Premiership. The third semi professional level – the NIFL Premier Intermediate League - was scrapped at the conclusion of the 2025-2026 season and replaced by the new NAFL Conference League, launching in 2026.

In its current format, it was founded in 2008 as the Premier Intermediate League for members of the previous IFA Intermediate League that met the new stricter membership criteria, though was marketed as the IFA Championship. In 2009, it was extended to two divisions: Championship 1 and Championship 2 with promotion and relegation between the two. In 2013, the Championship and Premiership became part of the Northern Ireland Football League, independent of the Irish Football Association (IFA).

Under reforms agreed by NIFL clubs in 2014, Championship 1 acquired senior status from the 2016–17 season onwards, continuing as the NIFL Championship. Championship 2 became the NIFL Premier Intermediate League, retaining its intermediate status.

The second level in Northern Irish football was known as the B Division from 1951 to 1995, the Irish League First Division from 1995 to 2003, the Irish First Division from 2003 to 2008, and the IFA Championship from 2008 to 2013.

== History ==
The B Division of the Irish League was founded in 1951, and originally consisted of the reserve teams of the senior Irish League clubs alongside some of the top intermediate clubs. It effectively replaced the Irish Intermediate League, which had been the de facto second tier league below the Irish League since 1915. The Irish Intermediate League continued alongside the B Division until 1954 when it ceased to exist and its remaining clubs joined the B Division.

The B Division was split geographically into North and South sections in 1974 (with a play-off to determine the winners in 1974–75 and 1975–76), and then into Section 1 (containing the intermediate clubs) and Section 2 (the reserve teams of senior clubs) in 1977. There was no promotion to the senior Irish League, although clubs could be elected to the senior league; Larne were elected in 1972 to replace Derry City, Carrick Rangers and Newry City were elected in 1983 when the Irish League expanded from 12 to 14 clubs, and Ballyclare Comrades and Omagh Town in 1990 when the league expanded to 16 clubs.

A new second tier was created in 1995 when the Irish League split into a Premier Division and First Division, each with eight clubs and automatic promotion and relegation introduced. In 2003 the Irish Football League was wound up, with the top division becoming the Irish Premier League and the second division becoming the Irish First Division. This continued for five seasons, until the NIFL Championship was created.

NIFL Championship will expand to 16 teams from 2026–27, with four teams from the final season of the Intermediate League automatically promoted. The first sixteen team season will initially see a double round-robin of 30 games, followed by a further seven games following a mid table split.

== Current clubs ==
Club	Stadium	Location	Capacity
Annagh United	BMG Arena	Portadown	1,250 (100 seated)
Ards	Clandeboye Park	Bangor	2,000 (500 seated)
Armagh City	Holm Park	Armagh	2,000 (500 seated)
Ballinamallard United	Ferney Park	Ballinamallard	2,000 (250 seated)
Dundela	Wilgar Park	Belfast	2,500
Glenavon	Mourneview Park	Lurgan	3,302 (all seated)
Harland & Wolff Welders	Blanchflower Stadium	Belfast	2,000
Institute	Ryan McBride Brandywell Stadium	Derry	3,700
Loughgall	Lakeview Park	Loughgall	1,300 (800 seated)
Moyola Park	Mill Meadow	Castledawson	2,000
Newington	Solitude	Belfast	3,054
Newry City	Newry Showgrounds	Newry	2,809 (831 seated)
Queen's University	Blanchflower Stadium	Belfast	2,000
Rathfriland Rangers	Iveagh Park	Rathfriland	1,000
Strabane Athletic	Limavady Showgrounds	Limavady	1,500 (274 seated)
Warrenpoint Town	Milltown	Warrenpoint	1,450

== List of second-tier champions ==
Season	Champions
Irish League B Division
1951–52	Linfield Swifts
1952–53	Linfield Swifts
1953–54	Cliftonville Olympic
1954–55	Larne
1955–56	Banbridge Town
1956–57	Larne
1957–58	Ards II
1958–59	Glentoran II
1959–60	Newry Town
1960–61	Ballyclare Comrades
1961–62	Carrick Rangers
1962–63	Ballyclare Comrades
1963–64	Larne
1964–65	Larne
1965–66	Larne
1966–67	Larne
1967–68	Dundela
1968–69	Larne
1969–70	Larne
1970–71	Larne
1971–72	Larne (elected to Irish League)
1972–73	Carrick Rangers
1973–74	Ballyclare Comrades
1974–75	Carrick Rangers (north/south play-off winners)
1975–76	Linfield Swifts (north/south play-off winners)
1976–77	Carrick Rangers and Dundela (shared)
Irish League B Division Section 1
1977–78	Ballyclare Comrades
1978–79	Carrick Rangers
1979–80	Ballyclare Comrades
1980–81	Newry Town
1981–82	Dundela
1982–83	Carrick Rangers (elected to Irish League)
1983–84	Limavady United
1984–85	Chimney Corner
1985–86	Dundela
1986–87	RUC
1987–88	Dundela
1988–89	Ballyclare Comrades
1989–90	Dundela
1990–91	Dundela
1991–92	Dundela
1992–93	Limavady United
1993–94	Dundela
1994–95	Loughgall
Irish League First Division
1995–96	Coleraine
1996–97	Ballymena United
1997–98	Newry Town
1998–99	Distillery
1999–00	Omagh Town
2000–01	Ards
2001–02	Lisburn Distillery
2002–03	Dungannon Swifts
Irish First Division
2003–04	Loughgall
2004–05	Armagh City
2005–06	Crusaders
2006–07	Institute
2007–08	Loughgall (not promoted)
IFA Championship
2008–09	Portadown
2009–10	Loughgall (not promoted)
2010–11	Carrick Rangers
2011–12	Ballinamallard United
2012–13	Ards
NIFL Championship
2013–14	Institute
2014–15	Carrick Rangers
2015–16	Ards
2016–17	Warrenpoint Town
2017–18	Institute
2018–19	Larne
2019–20	Portadown
2021–22	Newry City
2022–23	Loughgall
2023–24	Portadown
2024–25	Bangor
2025–26	Limavady United

== Knock-out competitions ==
In 1982, a knockout competition was introduced, known as the B Division Knockout Cup. It was discontinued after 2002, but a new Intermediate League Cup was played between 2004 and 2008. In 2008–09, there was no knockout competition for Championship clubs, who participated with Premiership clubs in the Irish League Cup. In the 2009–10 season only, while Championship 1 clubs continued to participate in the Irish League Cup, a Championship 2 League Cup was inaugurated for those in Championship 2. From 2010–11 onwards, all Championship clubs from divisions 1 and 2 also competed in the Irish League Cup, and the Championship 2 League Cup was abolished.

Season	Champions
B Division Knockout Cup
1982–83	RUC
1983–84	Ballyclare Comrades
1984–85	RUC
1985–86	RUC
1986–87	Chimney Corner
1987–88	Dundela
1988–89	Ballyclare Comrades
1989–90	Omagh Town
1990–91	Dundela
1991–92	Dundela
1992–93	Limavady United
1993–94	Dungannon Swifts
1994–95	Dundela
1995–96	Limavady United
1996–97	Institute
1997–98	Harland & Wolff Welders
1998–99	Ballymoney United
1999–00	Moyola Park
2000–01	Harland & Wolff Welders
2001–02	Harland & Wolff Welders
Intermediate League Cup
2004–05	Bangor
2005–06	Crusaders
2006–07	Institute
2007–08	Loughgall
Championship 2 League Cup
2009–10	Harland & Wolff Welders

== See also ==
- IFA Interim Intermediate League
- IFA Reserve League
- IFA Intermediate Cup
- George Wilson Cup
- Irish Cup
- Irish League Cup
- County Antrim Shield
- Steel & Sons Cup
- Mid-Ulster Cup
- Bob Radcliffe Cup
- North West Senior Cup
- Craig Memorial Cup
- Northern Ireland football league system
