= Rathfriland Rangers F.C. =

Association football club in Northern Ireland

Coordinates: 54°14′45.1″N 6°9′9.7″W

Rathfriland Rangers
- Full name: Rathfriland Rangers Football Club
- Nickname: The Whites
- Founded: 1962
- Ground: Iveagh Park, Rathfriland
- Chairman: Adrian Mcgaw
- Manager: Darren Mullen
- League: NIFL Championship
- 2025–26: NIFL Premier Intermediate League, 3rd of 14 (promoted)

Rathfriland Rangers Football Club, referred to as Rathfriland Rangers, or "The Whites", is a Northern Irish semi-professional football club, playing in the NIFL Championship. Rathfriland Rangers are a part of the Mid-Ulster Football Association. They compete in the Irish Cup.

The club was managed by former player Ally Wilson from March 2021 to October 2026. During this time, the club experienced an unprecedented era of success, gaining promotion from the NAFL Premier Division to the NIFL Championship, whilst also enjoying numerous Cup successes.

== Overview ==
The club is based in Rathfriland, County Down, was formed in 1962 and joined the Newcastle & District League before attaining intermediate status and then joining the Amateur League in 1986. The club currently consists of four teams: the 1st XI (Rangers), 2nd XI (Reserves) 3rd XI (Swifts) as well as an under-17 squad. The Reserves team plays in the Mid-Ulster Football League Reserve Championship, whilst the Swifts are in Reserve division 2 of the Mid-Ulster Football League. The club won the Intermediate Cup in 2022, defeating Armagh City in the final. In 2023, the club was promoted to the NIFL Premier Intermediate League for the first time. In their first season in PIL, the club would finish in 4th place, narrowly missing out on a NIFL Championship play-off spot, a commendable achievement for the club. A 3rd place finish at the end of the 2024-25 season, was followed up with a further 3rd place finish in 2025-26. With four clubs being promoted at the end of this season, Rathfriland secured an historic promotion to the NIFL Championship.

The club is captained by Jack Barbour.

== Current squad ==
Note: Flags indicate national team as defined under FIFA eligibility rules; some limited exceptions apply. Players may hold more than one non-FIFA nationality.

No.	Pos.	Nation	Player
2	DF	NIR	Daniel Devlin
3	DF	NIR	Jack Barbour
4	DF	NIR	Dalton Tate
5	MF	NIR	Brian Johnston
6	MF	NIR	Jordan Hayes
7	FW	NIR	Ruairi Fitzpatrick

No.	Pos.	Nation	Player
9	FW	NIR	Stephen McCavitt
13	MF	NIR	Matthew Holloway
14	DF	NIR	Harry Campbell
16	DF	NIR	Jake Corbett

== Honours ==
Senior Honours:

- Mid-Ulster Cup
  - Runners-Up 2025-26

Intermediate Honours:

- NIFL Premier Intermediate League 3rd place (Promoted)
  - 2025-26
- Northern Amateur Football League: Premier Division
  - 2021–22, 2022–23
- IFA Intermediate Cup:
  - 2021–22
- Bob Radcliffe Cup:
  - 2019–20, 2023–24, 2025-26
- Border Cup:
  - 2016–17
- Northern Amateur Football League: Division 1A
  - 1997–98, 2015–16
- Northern Amateur Football League: Division 1B
  - 1996–97
