= Milltown (stadium) =

Home ground of Warrenpoint Town F.C., Northern Ireland

- Interactive map of Milltown
- Location: Warrenpoint, Northern Ireland
- Coordinates: 54°07′04″N 06°15′48″W
- Owner: Warrenpoint Town F.C.
- Capacity: 1,450
- Surface: Grass

Construction
- Opened: 1997
- Renovated: 2013

Milltown is a football stadium in Warrenpoint, County Down, Northern Ireland. It is the home ground of Warrenpoint Town of the NIFL Premier Intermediate League. The stadium sits in the larger Milltown Sports Complex, in the area of Warrenpoint of the same name. The ground was upgraded in 2013 after Warrenpoint were promoted to the Premiership, to satisfy the rules of that league.

== History ==
In 2008, Warrenpoint Town applied to turn the pitch from natural grass into a 3G pitch, which was granted by the Newry and Mourne District Council. In 2013, Warrenpoint Town were promoted to the NIFL Premiership. Owing to previous consecutive promotions, Milltown did not meet the Irish Football Association's criteria for use in the Premiership. As a result, the ground required renovation. Warrenpoint Town originally applied to play their home games at The Showgrounds, Newry. However the stadium owners at Newry refused them permission. Instead they were obliged to groundshare with Dungannon Swifts at Stangmore Park, Dungannon forty miles (64 km) away whilst Milltown was redeveloped. Newry and Mourne Council granted Milltown £225,500 to assist with the redevelopment.

On 21 December 2013, Milltown was opened for its first NIFL Premiership match between Warrenpoint Town and Glenavon. However the match was forced to be abandoned after one of the floodlights failed. Despite the renovations, aimed to assist the ground to meet UEFA standards, observers note that the facilities are still limited at Milltown. It was used as justification for applying for a UEFA licence. Their 2019 application was refused however.

In 2018, it was announced that Newry, Mourne and Down District Council planned to redevelop Milltown as the location for a new community hub due to plans to purchase a surplus Police Service of Northern Ireland station falling through. However, this proposal was not recommended to the council's committee. This was due to accessibility and location issues, which led to the council preferring to build the hub at Clonallon Park instead.

== Usage ==
While Milltown is predominantly used by Warrenpoint Town for association football, it has also been used for Gaelic football by Warrenpoint GAA. Milltown is considered by some opposing football managers as being a hard place to play at.

== See also ==
- Stadiums of Ireland
