= Newington F.C. =

Association football club in Northern Ireland

Newington Football Club
- Full name: Newington Football Club
- Nicknames: The ‘Ton, The Swans
- Founded: 1979 (as Jubilee Olympic)
- Ground: Solitude, Belfast
- Chairman: Thomas Duffy
- Manager: Declan O'Hara
- League: NIFL Championship
- 2025–26: NIFL Championship, 4th of 12
- Website: newingtonfc.com
Home colours	Away colours

Newington Football Club (previously known as Newington Youth Club) is a semi-professional Northern Irish football club playing in NIFL Championship. The club originates from the Newington area of Belfast and ground shares with NIFL Premiership side Cliftonville F.C..

== History ==
The club was formed in north Belfast as Jubilee Olympic Football Club in 1979 and joined the Dunmurry League in 1980. The club changed its name to Newington Youth Club in 1986, won its first trophy—the Breen Cup—in 1987 and became the dominant team in the Dunmurry League for the remainder of their affiliation. In 1990–91 Newington became the first Dunmurry League club to win the County Antrim Junior Shield.

The club joined the Northern Amateur League in 1994. They played in Division 2C and won five trophies, including the league title in their first season. The following season saw them win Division 2B, gaining promotion to the top junior division of the Amateur League in the process.

Their greatest achievement in junior football came on 1 May 1997 when they won the biggest prize in junior football – the Irish FA Junior Cup. Newington defeated Fermanagh team Lisbellaw United in the final. A Division 2A title followed and soon the club was elevated to intermediate status, gaining a place in Division 1B in 2000. Newington continued to go from strength to strength, winning 1B at the first attempt, followed by the Division 1A title in 2001–02. However, Newington's facilities at their home ground (Muckamore Park, Antrim) failed to meet the required standards to gain promotion to the Amateur League Premier Division.

In 2004–05, Newington reached the quarter-finals of the Steel & Sons Cup, automatically qualifying for the County Antrim Shield; and their first match against senior opposition. A 2–0 defeat at Lisburn Distillery. At the end of that season, the club finished runners-up in Division 1A, but recent improvements to Muckamore Park meant that this time promotion to the Premier Division was realised.

In 2005–06, only eleven years after joining the League in its lowest division, Newington won the Amateur League title (and Border Cup) at the first time of asking. This season also saw the club reach the quarter-finals of the Irish Cup, losing out to Larne. In 2007–08, the club reached the semi-finals of the Irish Intermediate Cup, and in 2008–09 won the Amateur League title for the second time.

On 14 January 2012 the club managed what the BBC described as "one of the biggest shocks in Irish Cup history" when they defeated Glentoran 1–0 in the fifth round at the east Belfast giant's own ground, The Oval. Rated 20–1 by bookmakers to win the match, the club triumphed through Neil Quinn's goal and were drawn to face Dungannon Swifts in the sixth round.

On 24 May 2013, the biggest game in the club's history, they achieved promotion to NIFL Championship 2, the third tier of national football. They faced Mid-Ulster Football League champions Dollingstown in a two-legged play-off for promotion, and won the tie on the away goals rule after it finished 4–4 on aggregate. A 3–2 away defeat followed by a 2–1 home win was enough to seal promotion.

In 2016, the NIFL Championship 2 underwent a renewal, transforming into the NIFL Premier Intermediate League. Newington, a notable club during this transition, achieved significant success in the subsequent seasons.

In 2017, Newington clinched the Steel and Sons Cup. In 2021 they once again were named victors of the same cup.

The 2021/22 season saw Newington excel in the Premier Intermediate League, claiming the title and earning a promotion to the NIFL Championship. They finished ahead of Bangor F.C. by 7 points and Armagh City F.C. by 11 points.

Entering the 2022/23 NIFL Championship, Newington landed in 9th place, consolidating their position in the league. This period reflected their adaptability and marked a phase of growth for the club in the competitive football landscape.

After previously being known as Newington Youth F.C., the club are now known as Newington Football Club.

== Grounds ==
The club originates in the Newington area of Belfast, although owing to the lack of facilities for junior and intermediate clubs in north Belfast they have played home matches at Muckamore Park in Antrim, at Brantwood FC on Skegoneill Avenue, Richardson Park in Dunmurry, and The Cliff in Larne. In 2008, the club became involved in a partnership with IFA Premiership club Crusaders, with a view to securing funding for a new, shared ground in north Belfast. As part of the arrangement, Newington used Crusaders’ ground Seaview for home matches in 2008–09, marking a return to home matches in the club's native north Belfast. From the 2013–14 season, the club's first season in NIFL Championship 2, until 2017–18, the club played at Seaview again. In 2018, the club moved to share Solitude with Cliftonville They would play there until 2023, when they would move to Inver Park to groundshare with Larne.

== Honours ==
=== Intermediate honours ===
- NIFL Premier Intermediate League: 1
  - 2021–22
- Steel & Sons Cup: 2
  - 2017–18, 2021–22
- Northern Amateur League: 5
  - 2005–06, 2008–09, 2009–10, 2010–11, 2012–13
- Border Cup: 1
  - 2005–06

=== Junior honours ===
- Irish Junior Cup: 1
  - 1996–97
- County Antrim Junior Shield: 1
  - 1990–91

== Sources ==
- Newington Football Club, And if you know your history..., https://web.archive.org/web/20090514235835/http://www.newingtonyc.co.uk/history.html. Retrieved 14–05–09.
