= Dixon Park =

Football stadium in Northern Ireland

- Interactive map of Dixon Park
- Location: Ballyclare, County Antrim, Northern Ireland
- Coordinates: 54°45′02.50″N 6°00′06.99″W
- Capacity: 2,398 (538 seated)
- Surface: Artificial
- Scoreboard: No

Tenant
- Ballyclare Comrades F.C.

Website
- www.ballyclarecomrades.com

Dixon Park is a football stadium located in Ballyclare, County Antrim, Northern Ireland. It is home to Ballyclare Comrades F.C.

== Features ==
The stadium holds 2,398 with 538 seats. There is a small seated stand at one side, where the changing rooms and club offices are sited. There are covered standing areas behind each goal, and a standing area opposite the stand. The Comrades Social Club is located right beside the ground.

== Development ==
In the spring of 2010 work was carried out at the Ballyclare venue to supply new and additional seating, improve terraced views and provide modern toilets and press facilities.

The improvement works carried out by Ballyclare Comrades, in conjunction with Sport Northern Ireland, were designed to bring the stadium up to IFA Premiership standard – one of the benchmarks of which is the provision of 500 covered seats.

This has now been achieved with the building of a new 350-seat stand and additional seating added to the existing stand and in the visitors' enclosure behind the goal.
