= Upper Malone =

Sports facility in Belfast, Northern Ireland

- Location within Greater Belfast
- Full name: Upper Malone
- Location: Belfast, Northern Ireland
- Coordinates: 54.554°N 5.964°W
- Owner: Queen's University Belfast
- Capacity: 1,000 (330 seated)
- Surface: Grass

Construction
- Renovated: 2012

Tenants
- Queen's University A.F.C. Queen's University R.F.C.

Upper Malone, also known as the Dub, is a multi-sport facility owned by Queen's University Belfast. There are fourteen outdoor pitches together with the Arena Pitch, which is the home ground of the university's football, rugby union and Gaelic football teams. It is the only facility in Ireland and Britain that is home to all three codes of football. The Arena Pitch was opened in 2012 following a £20m redevelopment of the site.
