= Ferney Park =

Football stadium in Ballinamallard, Northern Ireland

Coordinates: 54.41435°N 7.59975°W

- Interactive map of Ferney Park
- Full name: Ferney Park
- Location: Ballinamallard, Northern Ireland
- Owner: Ballinamallard United F.C.
- Capacity: 2,000 (250 seated)
- Surface: Grass

Construction
- Built: 1975
- Renovated: 2006
- Expanded: 2012

Tenants
- Ballinamallard United; Fermanagh Mallards

Ferney Park is a football stadium in Ballinamallard, County Fermanagh, Northern Ireland. It is the home stadium of Ballinamallard United. It was first used by Ballinamallard United in 1975, when the club was founded.

== History ==
Since 2006, Ferney Park has undergone a number of renovations. The ground did not meet the criteria for use in the IFA Championship, which was established in 2008, and Ballinamallard played its home matches at Holm Park, the home of Armagh City, during the 2008/09 season and the first part of 2009/10, while it was brought up to standard. Ballinamallard's first match back at the upgraded Ferney Park was on 5 December 2009. Floodlights were installed in 2010. In 2012, Ballinamallard United were promoted to the IFA Premiership after receiving a domestic licence to do so from the Irish Football Association. However at the time, Ferney Park did not meet the required standards. The club were in the process of building two new stands, funded by fans buying seats. The plans and designs of the new stands were printed on the cover of the matchday programme for United's last game before being promoted against Ards. The building of the stands could not be guaranteed to be completed before the start of the Irish Premiership season. As a result, the club were obliged to nominate Stangmore Park in Dungannon, County Tyrone as their home ground if construction could not be finished in time. At a cost of £80,000 from four fans, the pitch at Ferney Park was also re-laid in preparation. However, the work was finished in time for Ferney Park to be used to host Ballinamallard's opening game against Dungannon Swifts. The new stands were also officially opened for this match.

In December 2012, during half-time in a match between Ballinamallard United and Linfield, the Ferney Park pitch was invaded by twenty Linfield supporters who waved Union Flags from the centre of the pitch. This was done as part of the Belfast City Hall flag protests. Ballinamallard United had no prior warning that this would happen and the Police Service of Northern Ireland took no actions amid fears of inflaming the situation.

== Usage ==
Ferney Park is home to Ballinamallard United and is also used to host their reserves' matches. It is also home to the Fermanagh Mallards women's football club. In 2012, Ferney Park was used to host the opening game of the Northern Ireland Milk Cup between Fermanagh and English side, Newcastle United. This was done to commemorate the Milk Cup's 30th anniversary by playing competition matches away from the normal locations along the north coast of Northern Ireland.

Ferney Park has received a reputation in Northern Irish football as being a difficult ground to find with members of the media covering games at the stadium often getting lost on their way to it. This sometimes led to television channels having to use Ballinamallard United's own coverage of matches to be broadcast on television. This was often attributed to television companies deeming it too expensive to regularly send cameras to Ballinamallard. This situation has been criticized by Ballinamallard residents who feel that television coverage of Ballinamallard United is not as detailed as other teams because of the location of Ferney Park.
