= The Showgrounds (Newry) =

Football stadium in Newry, Northern Ireland

Coordinates: 54°09′01.60″N 6°19′14.18″W

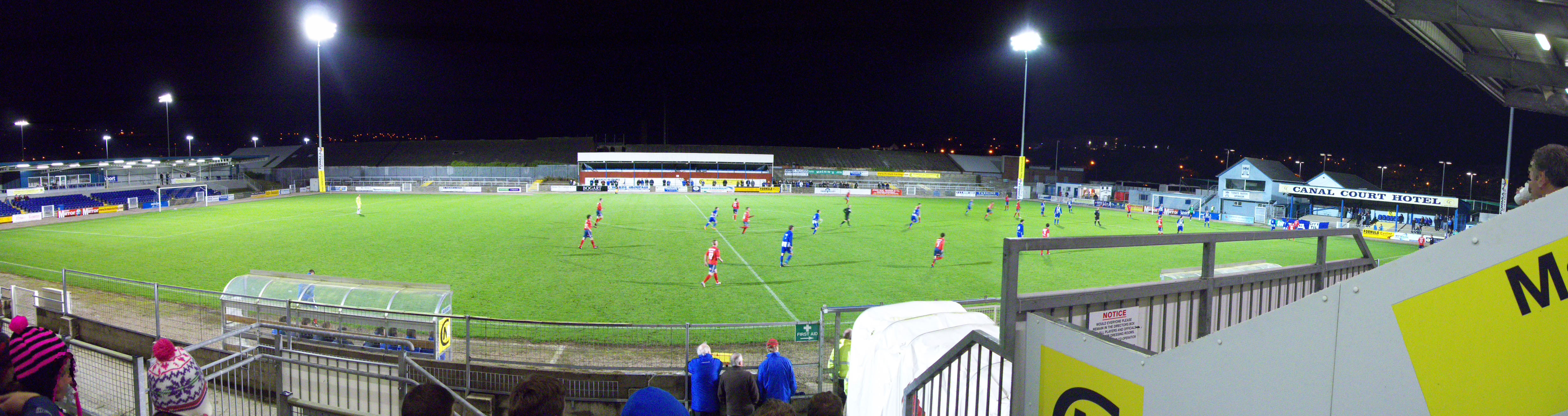
- The Showgrounds
- Interactive map of The Showgrounds
- Location: Greenbank Industrial Estate, Newry, County Down, BT34 2QF
- Capacity: 7,949 (limited to 2,275 – 1,080 seated).
- Surface: Grass (110 x 75 yds)

Construction
- Opened: 1923
- Expanded: 2010

Tenant
- Newry City FC (1923–2012) Newry City AFC (2013–Present)

The Showgrounds is a football stadium in Newry, County Down, Northern Ireland. It was the home ground of Newry City F.C. and is now the home ground of their successor club, Newry City A.F.C. The stadium holds 7,949, but is currently restricted to 2,275 under safety legislation.

The stadium is located in the Greenbank Industrial Estate on the Warrenpoint Road, close to the Down GAA home stadium of Páirc Esler.

== History ==
In 2009, The Showgrounds had two new stands constructed. In 2011, there were plans to turn The Showgrounds' pitch into an artificial turf pitch however due to Newry City's financial troubles, these plans were shelved. In 2012, on the eighteenth day of the 2012 Summer Olympics torch relay, the Olympic torch passed The Showgrounds on its way to Páirc Esler.

In 2012, Newry City were liquidated after a High Court winding-up petition. Discussions on creating a phoenix club, initially titled "Newry City 2012" and eventually titled "Newry City AFC", took place at The Showgrounds. When Newry City was wound up, The Showgrounds were not sold off with the club as it was owned by Newry City's supporters and not the club. This meant that Newry City AFC would be able to use it as their home ground.

== Usage ==
It was used to host Newry City's matches and also hosts the fixtures of Newry City AFC after Newry City was liquidated. It is also used for training. In 2013, The Showgrounds were suggested as a temporary home ground for Warrenpoint Town after they were promoted to the NIFL Premiership as their Milltown Playing Field did not fulfill the criteria for use in the NIFL Premiership. However, the Irish Football Association blocked the move as the owners of The Showgrounds objected. Newry City AFC also gave reasons for objecting the potential groundshare, citing the poor quality of the playing surface, the lack of a licence for The Showgrounds to host NIFL Premiership matches and a large increase in insurance and running costs for Newry City if the groundshare went ahead.

The Showgrounds are also used to host the Bessbrook Cup Final, which is traditionally played on Saint Stephen's Day. In 2013, the Bessbrook Cup final was postponed after one of The Showgrounds' floodlight pylons had been damaged in bad weather, which led to Health and Safety officials deeming that The Showgrounds were unsafe to be used for the match.

== International football ==
The Showgrounds have been used to host youth international fixtures. In 2005, it was a venue in the 2005 UEFA European Under-19 Football Championship. In 2009, it was used to host some of the 2009 UEFA European Under-19 Football Championship qualification matches for Group 9.

== Panoramic view ==
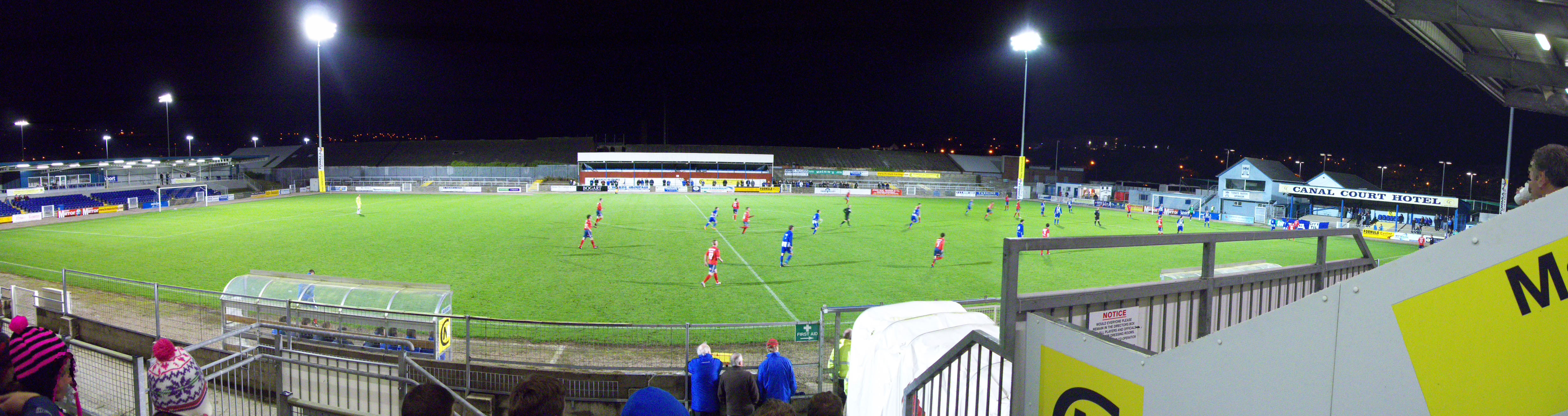
