= Clandeboye Park =

Football stadium in Bangor, Northern Ireland

Coordinates: 54°39′05.85″N 5°41′04.11″W

- Interactive map of Clandeboye Park
- Full name: Clandeboye Park
- Location: Bangor, Northern Ireland
- Owner: Bangor F.C.
- Capacity: 2850
- Surface: Artificial

Construction
- Opened: September 14, 1935
- Renovated: 1987

Tenants
- Bangor; Ards

Clandeboye Park is a football stadium in Bangor, Northern Ireland. It is the home ground of NIFL Premiership side Bangor FC and is intended to be the temporary home of fellow NIFL Championship side and local rivals Ards FC.

== History ==
Bangor FC have been playing in the stadium since 1935 after it was built by the Bangor Borough Council. Ards FC were forced to sell their previous ground Castlereagh Park in 1998 amid mounting financial hardships. Ards since then have ground-shared with many different local clubs, however their primary home has become the home of their local rivals Bangor while they still hoping to build their own stadium.

At one time, the pitch was the smallest in the Irish league. This, however, is no longer the case as the pitch was enlarged after the stock-car racing track was removed in the later years of the 20th century.
