= Ryan McGivern =

Northern Irish footballer (born 1990)

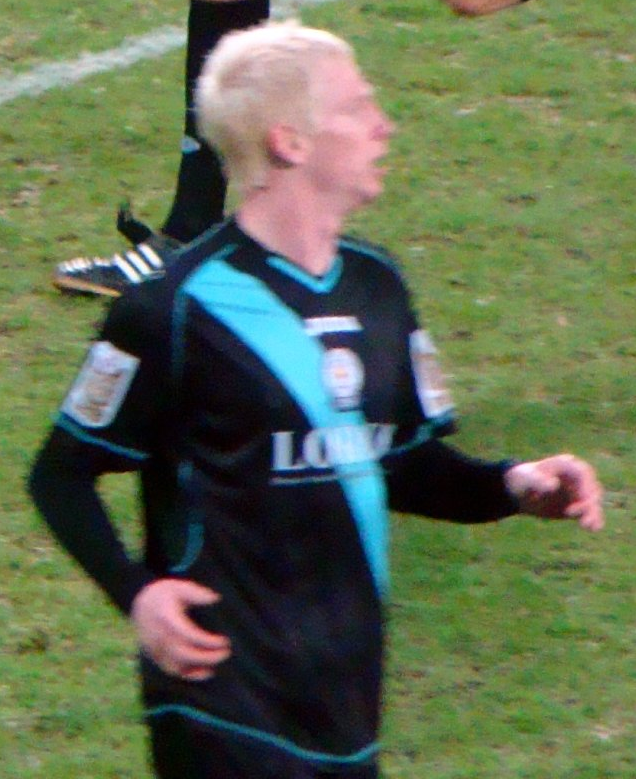
- McGivern playing for Leicester City in 2010

Personal information
- Full name: Ryan McGivern
- Date of birth: 8 January 1990 (age 36)
- Place of birth: Newry, Northern Ireland
- Height: 5 ft 10 in (1.78 m)
- Position: Defender

Youth career
- 2006–2008: Manchester City

Senior career*
Years	Team	Apps	(Gls)
2008–2013	Manchester City	1	(0)
2008	→ Morecambe (loan)	5	(1)
2009–2010	→ Leicester City (loan)	12	(0)
2010–2011	→ Walsall (loan)	15	(0)
2011	→ Crystal Palace (loan)	5	(0)
2011–2012	→ Bristol City (loan)	31	(0)
2012–2013	→ Hibernian (loan)	27	(1)
2013–2014	Hibernian	33	(0)
2014–2016	Port Vale	48	(0)
2016–2017	Shrewsbury Town	15	(0)
2017–2018	Northampton Town	1	(0)
2018	Swindon Town	6	(0)
2018–2021	Linfield	18	(3)
2021–2025	Newry City	78	(0)
Total		295	(5)

International career
	Northern Ireland U16	3	(0)
	Northern Ireland U17	9	(2)
2007–2008	Northern Ireland U19	6	(2)
2010–2012	Northern Ireland U21	6	(1)
2008–2016	Northern Ireland	24	(0)
2009	Northern Ireland B	1	(0)
- * Club domestic league appearances and goals

Ryan McGivern (born 8 January 1990) is a Northern Irish football coach and former player who coaches at Portadown.

McGivern played as a left-back or a central defender and began his career with Manchester City and won the FA Youth Cup with the club in 2008. He played on loan at Morecambe, Leicester City, Walsall, Crystal Palace, Bristol City and Hibernian. He spent the 2012–13 season on loan at Hibernian, playing on the losing side in the 2013 final of the Scottish Cup, before he joined the club permanently for a one-season stay in the Scottish Premiership. He joined Port Vale in June 2014 and made 55 appearances for the club across two seasons. He moved on to Shrewsbury Town in June 2016 and had his contract terminated by mutual consent 14 months later. He signed a short-term contract with Northampton Town in November 2017 before moving on to Swindon Town four months later. He returned to Northern Ireland in July 2018 to sign for Linfield. Linfield won the NIFL Premiership title in his first two seasons, though he made only limited appearances. He joined hometown club Newry City in June 2021 and helped them win the NIFL Championship title in the 2021–22 season and the Mid-Ulster Cup in 2023.

He won caps for Northern Ireland at under-16, under-17, under-19 and under-21 levels before he won his first senior cap in August 2008. He won a total of 24 caps in an eight-year international career. He has also played for the Northern Ireland B team.

== Club career ==
=== Manchester City ===
Born in Newry, McGivern is a product of the Manchester City youth teams. He played in the club's 2008 FA Youth Cup final win over Chelsea. He scored in the 2007–08 Premier Academy League play-off semi-final win over Sunderland, before featuring in the side that lost to Aston Villa in the play-offs.

On 25 October 2008, McGivern joined Morecambe on loan; "Shrimps" manager Sammy McIlroy stated that "I have seen Ryan play a few times and been very impressed by what I've seen". Having already won international caps, he made his debut in the Football League on 25 October, featuring in a 2–1 defeat to Port Vale at Vale Park. He scored his first ever senior goal in a 2–0 victory over Aldershot Town at Christie Park on 1 November. In total he played five League Two games and made one appearance in the Football League Trophy. McGivern was promoted to Manchester City's first-team squad for their Premier League game versus Fulham on 12 April 2009 and was an unused substitute.

On 29 August 2009, McGivern joined Championship side Leicester City on loan until January 2010. He made his debut for Nigel Pearson's "Foxes" in a 2–0 win over Crystal Palace at the King Power Stadium on 20 October. Despite scoring an own goal in a 1–1 draw with Ipswich Town on 10 January, the following day his loan was extended until the end of the 2009–10 season. He played a total of twelve league games for Leicester but was not selected for the Championship play-off semi-finals, which they lost to Cardiff City.

McGivern was loaned to Chris Hutchings's League One club Walsall on loan for the 2010–11 season, having beaten competition for his services from other clubs. He was a regular in the first-team before losing his place after getting sent off for a "reckless two-footed challenge" during a 1–1 draw with Fleetwood Town in the FA Cup on 6 November. He made a total of 16 appearances for the "Saddlers" during his stay at the Bescot Stadium before he was recalled on 20 January 2011. City manager Roberto Mancini handed McGivern his first-team debut at the City of Manchester Stadium in a Premier League game against Sunderland on 3 April 2011, using him as a 70th-minute substitute to replace Dedryck Boyata in a game that City won 5–0.

After signing a new deal, keeping him at City until 2013, McGivern made a 28-day loan move to Crystal Palace on 3 August 2011. He provided an assist for Jonathan Parr on his home debut for Dougie Freedman's "Eagles" at Selhurst Park, in a 2–0 victory over Burnley on 13 August. After his loan spell at Palace ended, McGivern moved to Bristol City for the remainder of the 2011–12 season. He made his debut for Derek McInnes's "Robins" on 10 September, in a 1–0 defeat to Brighton & Hove Albion at Ashton Gate. He made a total of 32 appearances for Bristol City, helping the club to finish above the Championship relegation zone.

=== Hibernian ===
In August 2012, McGivern signed on loan for Pat Fenlon's Scottish Premier League side Hibernian until January 2013. Having been an unused substitute for two games, he finally made his debut, coming on for Alan Maybury, in a 2–1 loss against Aberdeen at Pittodrie Stadium. He then established himself at "Hibs", playing in the left-back position, replacing Maybury, who would play in the right-back position. His playing time having been increased, his loan deal was extended until the end of the 2012–13 season. After having his loan extended, McGivern said he would decide his future beyond then at the end of the season. During a match against Dundee United on 24 February 2013, McGivern was penalized for a foul on Gary Mackay-Steven which resulted in a penalty kick for United even though television coverage showed the incident was clearly outside the penalty area. After the match, McGivern criticised referee Alan Muir and his assistant Graham McNeillie for their decision. McGivern scored his first goal for Hibernian three days later, a 2–2 draw with Kilmarnock at Easter Road.

McGivern agreed to a two-year contract with Hibernian after his contract with Manchester City came to an end. He made 38 appearances in the 2013–14 campaign, as the club suffered relegation into the Championship under the stewardship of Terry Butcher.

=== Port Vale ===
McGivern signed a two-year contract with League One side Port Vale in June 2014 after newly appointed Hibernian boss Alan Stubbs agreed to release him from the remaining 12 months of his contract. He started the 2014–15 season in a centre-back partnership with Richard Duffy. He remained a regular first-team player until he fractured his arm in a 2–0 defeat to Coventry City at Vale Park on 13 December; the injury required a plate to be fitted in his arm and a six-week recovery period.

He was out of the first-team picture in the first two months of the 2015–16 season before he returned to the starting eleven due to injuries to Ryan Inniss and Remie Streete. He was released upon the expiry of his contract at the end of the season.

=== Shrewsbury Town ===
McGivern signed with League One side Shrewsbury Town in June 2016, along with former Port Vale teammates A-Jay Leitch-Smith and Louis Dodds. He made his debut for the club on the opening day of the season, in a 0−1 home defeat against Milton Keynes. Featuring regularly for the club in the early part of the season saw McGivern recalled to the Northern Ireland squad for the first time in nearly two years, however, subsequent call-ups limited his first-team opportunities at Shrewsbury during a period which also saw manager Micky Mellon leave the club. He was recalled to the side by new manager Paul Hurst as Shrewsbury kept back-to-back clean sheets in 0−0 draws against former club Port Vale and Fleetwood Town, but a shoulder injury picked up in the next match, a 1−0 victory away at Millwall in December, kept him out of contention for a minimum of three weeks. He was not allocated a squad number ahead of the following season, having been told he was not in the club's plans. On 31 August 2017, McGivern had his contract terminated by mutual consent.

=== Northampton Town ===
On 3 November 2017, McGivern signed a two-month contract with League One side Northampton Town. Manager Jimmy Floyd Hasselbaink said that "with Regan Poole playing a lot of his football in midfield recently and with Leon Barnett recovering from injury, while Ash Taylor and Aaron Pierre have done very well, they have had to play a lot of football recently and haven't had the benefit of competition for their places. Ryan coming in provides that and, with him having been on the training ground with us for a while, we have had the chance to have a look at him and he has already fitted in well with the group." He was released by the "Cobblers" upon the expiry of his contract on 3 January 2018.

=== Swindon Town ===
On 15 March 2018, following an increasing number of injuries at the County Ground, McGivern joined Swindon Town on a deal until the end of the 2017–18 League Two campaign. He was Phil Brown's first signing as manager of the "Robins". Swindon offered him a new contract at the end of the season, but never signed it and instead left the club on 28 June after Brown confirmed that the offer had been withdrawn.

=== Linfield ===
On 23 July 2018, following his release from Swindon, McGivern returned to Northern Ireland to join NIFL Premiership side Linfield on a three-year deal. "Blues" manager David Healy said that he believed McGivern would "make a major contribution to the club". However, injury problems meant that he featured only five times during the 2018–19 title-winning season after making his debut in a 1–0 victory over Ballymena United on 23 February. He was an unused substitute in the final of the Northern Ireland Football League Cup, where Linfield beat Ballymena United. He made 12 appearances during the 2019–20 season, before self-isolating after testing positive for Coronavirus disease 2019 on 10 March. Linfield were crowned league champions on points per game after the season was ended early due to the COVID-19 pandemic in Northern Ireland. He featured just four times in the 2020–21 campaign, scoring one goal in a 5–1 win over Carrick Rangers at Windsor Park.

=== Newry City ===
On 8 June 2021, he signed a two-year contract with NIFL Championship club Newry City, his hometown club. He was sent off during a 2–0 win at Ards in November. He made 21 league appearances in the 2021–22 campaign as Newry won the Championship title and secured promotion into the NIFL Premiership. On 7 February 2023, he played in the Mid-Ulster Cup final as Newry beat Dungannon Swifts 2–0. He featured in 33 league games throughout the 2022–23 season. He featured 26 times in the 2023–24 season as the club were relegated in last place. He extended his stay into the 2024–25 season. Newry suffered a second successive relegeation. McGivern then announced his retirement.

== International career ==
McGivern was a regular at various under-age levels for Northern Ireland, winning caps at under-17 level in 2006, before elevation to the under-19 set-up in 2007. He played in the Northern Ireland elite side during their 2008 Milk Cup win.

Steve Beaglehole called McGivern to the Northern Ireland Under-21 squad for a mini-tournament in Ukraine on 19 and 20 August 2008. He did not make his under-21 debut as Nigel Worthington instead promoted McGivern into the full Northern Ireland squad as a replacement for the injured George McCartney for a friendly international against Scotland on 20 August. Aged 18, he made his debut in that match as a starter, but was sent off for two bookable offences by referee Nicolai Vollquartz. On 11 October 2008, he made his competitive debut for Northern Ireland, coming on as a second-half substitute in a 2010 FIFA World Cup qualifying match against Slovenia; the match ended in a 2–0 defeat. He continued to make occasional appearances for the national team, featuring in three further 2010 World Cup qualifying games. However, he played in just one Euro 2012 qualifying game and two 2014 World Cup qualification matches. He played twice for Northern Ireland in their successful Euro 2016 campaign but did not make the squad for the finals in France. He was recalled to the squad in September 2016 for their first 2018 World Cup qualifying match against the Czech Republic. McGivern made his first international appearance since 2014, as a half-time substitute in a 3–0 defeat to Croatia, on 15 November 2016.

== Coaching career ==
McGivenr joined the coaching staff at Portadown in July 2025.

== Career statistics ==
=== Club statistics ===
Appearances and goals by club, season and competition
Club	Season	League			National cup (Note: Includes FA Cup, Scottish Cup, Irish Cup)		League cup (Note: Includes Football League Cup, Scottish League Cup, Northern Ireland Football League Cup)		Other		Total	
Club	Season	Division	Apps	Goals	Apps	Goals	Apps	Goals	Apps	Goals	Apps	Goals
Manchester City	2008–09	Premier League	0	0	0	0	0	0	0	0	0	0
Manchester City	2009–10	Premier League	0	0	0	0	0	0	0	0	0	0
Manchester City	2010–11	Premier League	1	0	0	0	0	0	0	0	1	0
Manchester City	2011–12	Premier League	0	0	0	0	0	0	0	0	0	0
Manchester City	2012–13	Premier League	0	0	0	0	0	0	0	0	0	0
Manchester City	Total		1	0	0	0	0	0	0	0	1	0
Morecambe (loan)	2008–09	League Two	5	1	0	0	—		1 (Note: Appearance(s) in the Football League Trophy / EFL Trophy.)	0	6	1
Leicester City (loan)	2009–10	Championship	12	0	2	0	—		—		14	0
Walsall (loan)	2010–11	League One	15	0	1	0	0	0	0	0	16	0
Crystal Palace (loan)	2011–12	Championship	5	0	0	0	0	0	—		5	0
Bristol City (loan)	2011–12	Championship	31	0	1	0	—		—		32	0
Hibernian	2012–13	Scottish Premier League	27	1	5	0	—		—		32	1
Hibernian	2013–14	Scottish Premiership	33	0	1	0	2	0	2 (Note: Appearance(s) in the play-offs.)	0	38	0
Hibernian	Total		60	1	6	0	2	0	2	0	70	1
Port Vale	2014–15	League One	20	0	1	0	2	0	0	0	23	0
Port Vale	2015–16	League One	28	0	3	0	0	0	1	0	32	0
Port Vale	Total		48	0	4	0	2	0	1	0	55	0
Shrewsbury Town	2016–17	EFL League One	15	0	1	0	2	0	0	0	18	0
Shrewsbury Town	2017–18	EFL League One	0	0	0	0	0	0	0	0	0	0
Shrewsbury Town	Total		15	0	1	0	2	0	0	0	18	0
Northampton Town	2017–18	EFL League One	1	0	1	0	—		1	0	3	0
Swindon Town	2017–18	EFL League Two	6	0	—		—		—		6	0
Linfield	2018–19	NIFL Premiership	5	0	0	0	0	0	0	0	5	0
Linfield	2019–20	NIFL Premiership	9	2	0	0	3	0	0	0	12	2
Linfield	2020–21	NIFL Premiership	4	1	0	0	0	0	0	0	4	1
Linfield	Total		18	3	0	0	3	0	0	0	21	3
Newry City	2021–22	NIFL Championship	21	0	1	0	0	0	0	0	22	0
Newry City	2022–23	NIFL Premiership	33	0	1	0	2	0	0	0	36	0
Newry City	2023–24	NIFL Premiership	24	0	2	0	0	0	0	0	26	0
Newry City	Total		78	0	4	0	2	0	0	0	84	0
Career total			295	5	20	0	11	0	5	0	331	5

=== International statistics ===
Northern Ireland national team
Year	Apps	Goals
2008	4	0
2009	4	0
2010	5	0
2011	1	0
2012	5	0
2013	1	0
2014	3	0
2015	0	0
2016	1	0
Total	24	0

== Honours ==
Northern Ireland

- Milk Cup: 2008

Manchester City

- FA Youth Cup: 2008

Hibernian

- Scottish Cup runner-up: 2013

Linfield

- NIFL Premiership: 2018–19, 2019–20, 2020–21
- Irish League Cup: 2018–19

Newry City

- NIFL Championship: 2021–22
- Mid-Ulster Cup: 2023
