= 2025–26 County Antrim Shield =

Tournament details
- Country: Northern Ireland
- Teams: 16

Final positions
- Champions: Carrick Rangers (2nd title)
- Runners-up: Cliftonville

Tournament statistics
- Matches played: 15
- Goals scored: 45 (3 per match)

Official website
- countyantrimfa.org

The 2025–26 County Antrim Shield was the 137th edition of the County Antrim Shield, a cup competition in men's Northern Irish football.

Carrick Rangers won the tournament for the second time, defeating Cliftonville 4–2 on penalties after a 1–1 draw in the final.

== Results ==
=== First round ===
Team 1	Score	Team 2
Ballyclare Comrades	0–2	Ballymena United
Ballymacash Rangers	1–0	Dundela
Carrick Rangers	3–0	Bangor
Cliftonville	2–0	Crusaders
Glentoran	3–1	Ards
Larne	1–0	Queen's University
Linfield	6–1	Harland & Wolff Welders
Newington	3–0	Knockbreda

=== Quarter-finals ===
Team 1	Score	Team 2
Ballymacash Rangers	0–3	Larne
Carrick Rangers	2–2 (5–4 p)	Glentoran
Cliftonville	4–1	Linfield
Newington	0–1	Ballymena United

=== Semi-finals ===
Team 1	Score	Team 2
Ballymena United	1–4	Cliftonville
Carrick Rangers	1–1 (4–3 p)	Larne

=== Final ===
20 January 2026
19:45 GMT

Carrick Rangers	1–1	Cliftonville
Lecky 80'	Report	Curran 3'
Penalties
Callacher (penalty scored); McCllough (penalty scored); Gibson (penalty scored); Steele (penalty scored)	4–2	(penalty missed) Curran; (penalty scored) Addis; (penalty scored) Hale; (penalty missed) McStravick

Seaview, Belfast
Referee: Christopher Morrison (Northern Ireland)

GK	13	(Northern Ireland) Scott Pengelly
RB	2	(Republic of Ireland) Michael Place
CB	4	(Northern Ireland) Billy Joe Burns	(yellow card) 87'
CB	6	(Northern Ireland) Jimmy Callacher
CB	12	(Northern Ireland) Luke McCullough (c)
LB	15	(Northern Ireland) Ben Buchanan-Rolleston
CM	14	(Northern Ireland) Aidan Steele
CM	19	(Northern Ireland) Joe Crowe
CM	24	(Northern Ireland) Matthew Snoody	(yellow card) 45'	(substituted off) 45'
ST	22	(Northern Ireland) Paul Heatley	(yellow card) 52'
ST	9	(Northern Ireland) Daniel Gibson
Substitutes:
GK	33	(Northern Ireland) Lorcan Donnelly
DF	25	(Northern Ireland) Ryan McKay
MF	34	(United States) Matthew Olosunde
MF	29	(Northern Ireland) Eoghan McCawl
FW	10	(Northern Ireland) Adam Lecky		(substituted on) 45'
FW	18	(Northern Ireland) Jack Boyd
FW	40	(Scotland) Joe Moore
Manager:
(Northern Ireland) Stephen Baxter

GK	31	(Scotland) Peter Morrison
RB	26	(England) Joseph Toole
CB	24	(Northern Ireland) Aidan Kelly
CB	4	(Northern Ireland) Jonny Addis	(yellow card) 86'
CB	12	(Northern Ireland) Shaun Leppard
LB	15	(Northern Ireland) Reece Jordan
CM	8	(Republic of Ireland) Rory Hale (c)	(yellow card) 52'
CM	6	(Northern Ireland) Harry Wilson	(yellow card) 70'
CM	42	(England) Adebayo Fapetu		(substituted off) 83'
ST	19	(Northern Ireland) Joe Gormley		(substituted off) 76'
ST	9	(Northern Ireland) Ryan Curran
Substitutes:
GK	1	(Wales) Lewis Ridd
DF	2	(Republic of Ireland) Conor Pepper		(substituted on) 76'
DF	45	(Northern Ireland) Shea McGarry
MF	6	(England) Sean Robertson
MF	41	(Northern Ireland) Joe Sheridan
MF	27	(Northern Ireland) Liam McStravick		(substituted on) 83'
FW	36	(Northern Ireland) Keevan Hawthorne
Manager:
(Northern Ireland) Jim Magilton

Man of the Match:
Jimmy Callacher (Carrick Rangers)

Assistant referees:
David Burns (Northern Ireland)
Ken Ross (Northern Ireland)
Fourth official:
Mark Milligan (Northern Ireland)

Match rules

- 90 minutes
- Penalty shoot-out if scores still level
- Seven named substitutes
- Maximum of five substitutions
