= 2018–19 NIFL Championship =

NIFL Championship
- Season: 2018–19
- Dates: 10 August 2018 - 27 April 2019
- Champions: Larne (1st second-tier senior title)
- Promoted: Larne; Carrick Rangers (via play-off)
- Relegated: Limavady United
- Matches: 192
- Goals: 663 (3.45 per match)
- Biggest home win: Larne 6–0 Limavady United (17 November 2018); Loughgall 6–0 Dergview (24 November 2018)
- Biggest away win: H&W Welders 0–6 Portadown (16 February 2019)
- Highest scoring: Carrick Rangers 7–2 H&W Welders (9 February 2019)

The 2018–19 NIFL Championship was the third season of the NIFL Championship since gaining senior status. It is the second-tier of the Northern Ireland Football League - the national football league in Northern Ireland.

== Teams ==
The 2018–19 NIFL Championship was contested by 12 teams. Institute were champions in the previous season, and were promoted to the 2018–19 NIFL Premiership. They were replaced by the bottom team in last season's Premiership, Ballinamallard United. Runners-up Newry City won 6–3 on aggregate in the promotion play-off against Carrick Rangers, also achieving promotion to the Premiership for this season and relegating Carrick Rangers to the Championship.

The bottom team from the previous season, Lurgan Celtic, were relegated to the third-tier NIFL Premier Intermediate League. They were replaced by Dundela, winners of the Premier Intermediate League. The eleventh-placed team from the previous season, Dergview, remained in the Championship this season, after defeating the NIFL Premier Intermediate League runners-up Queen's University 4–1 on aggregate in the relegation play-off.

=== Stadia and locations ===
Locations of the 2018–19 NIFL Championship teams
Locations of the Belfast-based 2018–19 NIFL Championship teams

Club	Stadium	Location	Capacity
Ballinamallard United	Ferney Park	Ballinamallard	2,000 (250 seated)
Ballyclare Comrades	Dixon Park	Ballyclare	5,333
Carrick Rangers	Loughshore Hotel Arena	Carrickfergus	4,500 (150 seated)
Dergview	Darragh Park	Castlederg	1,200
Dundela	Wilgar Park	Belfast	2,500
Harland & Wolff Welders	Tillysburn Park	Belfast	3,000
Knockbreda	Breda Park	Belfast	1,000
Larne	Inver Park	Larne	3,000
Limavady United	The Showgrounds	Limavady	1,500
Loughgall	Lakeview Park	Loughgall	3,000
PSNI	Newforge Lane	Belfast	1,500
Portadown	Shamrock Park	Portadown	3,940 (2,765 seated)

== League table ==
Pos	Team	Pld	W	D	L	GF	GA	GD	Pts	Promotion, qualification or relegation (Note: Teams play each other twice (22 matches), before the league splits into two groups (the top six and the bottom six) for the last ten matches.)
1	Larne (C, P)	32	26	3	3	87	19	+68	81	Promotion to the NIFL Premiership
2	Carrick Rangers (O, P)	32	20	4	8	59	42	+17	64	Qualification for the promotion play-offs
3	Portadown	32	15	6	11	59	55	+4	51	Qualification for the promotion play-offs
4	Dundela	32	13	7	12	67	60	+7	46	
5	Ballinamallard United	32	12	3	17	39	51	−12	39	
6	Harland & Wolff Welders	32	11	2	19	45	68	−23	35	
7	Loughgall	32	11	9	12	60	52	+8	42	
8	Dergview	32	13	3	16	51	51	0	42	
9	Ballyclare Comrades	32	11	7	14	58	68	−10	40	
10	Knockbreda	32	10	7	15	45	63	−18	37	
11	PSNI (O)	32	9	7	16	48	72	−24	34	Qualification for the relegation play-off
12	Limavady United (R)	32	8	8	16	45	62	−17	32	Relegation to the NIFL Premier Intermediate League

Source: NIFL
Rules for classification: 1) Points; 2) Goal difference; 3) Number of goals scored; 4) Head-to-head points; 5) Head-to-head goal difference; 6) Drawing of lots
(C) Champions; (O) Play-off winners; (P) Promoted; (R) Relegated

== Results ==
=== Matches 1–22 ===
During matches 1–22 each team played every other team twice (home and away).

Home \ Away	BMD	BCC	CRK	DGV	DUN	H&W	KNB	LAR	LIM	LOU	POR	PSN
Ballinamallard United	—	1–0	1–2	1–4	1–1	2–0	0–1	2–0	3–0	1–2	1–2	3–0
Ballyclare Comrades	2–0	—	1–4	2–2	3–3	0–2	2–1	0–4	1–1	2–1	2–1	2–2
Carrick Rangers	1–3	2–0	—	1–0	0–5	1–4	3–0	2–0	3–1	1–1	2–0	4–2
Dergview	1–2	1–2	0–2	—	1–3	2–1	3–0	1–1	0–2	1–3	1–2	2–3
Dundela	3–2	2–4	0–0	3–2	—	1–4	1–1	0–2	2–2	5–2	2–3	3–3
Harland & Wolff Welders	2–0	3–4	1–0	2–1	1–0	—	1–3	2–3	1–2	0–2	0–2	1–1
Knockbreda	1–2	3–2	0–2	5–3	0–4	1–2	—	1–1	0–1	3–2	2–2	2–2
Larne	1–0	3–1	4–0	2–0	5–0	3–0	2–0	—	6–0	4–1	2–2	4–0
Limavady United	1–2	3–3	2–1	1–2	1–4	1–2	1–2	1–3	—	1–1	2–2	3–4
Loughgall	2–2	4–2	1–1	6–0	1–2	0–2	4–0	2–3	2–1	—	1–1	3–2
Portadown	5–0	3–1	0–2	2–1	0–4	3–2	4–3	0–3	2–2	2–1	—	2–0
PSNI	0–0	1–4	2–0	0–1	1–2	4–2	1–3	1–2	1–0	3–1	3–2	—

Source: NIFL
Legend: Blue = home team win; Yellow = draw; Red = away team win.

=== Matches 23–32 ===
During matches 23–32 each team plays every other team in their half of the table twice (home and away).

==== Top six ====
Home \ Away	BMD	CRK	DUN	H&W	LAR	POR
Ballinamallard United	—	1–2	2–0	3–0	0–5	1–0
Carrick Rangers	2–1	—	3–2	7–2	1–0	4–0
Dundela	4–0	1–2	—	4–1	0–5	2–0
Harland & Wolff Welders	2–1	1–2	2–2	—	0–2	0–6
Larne	3–0	4–0	3–0	2–1	—	3–0
Portadown	2–1	2–2	3–2	3–1	1–2	—

Source: NIFL
Legend: Blue = home team win; Yellow = draw; Red = away team win.

==== Bottom six ====
Home \ Away	BCC	DGV	KNB	LIM	LOU	PSN
Ballyclare Comrades	—	2–3	1–1	4–1	1–4	1–3
Dergview	2–0	—	3–0	0–1	1–0	2–1
Knockbreda	2–1	0–4	—	1–3	0–0	5–2
Limavady United	0–1	1–4	3–0	—	1–3	1–1
Loughgall	3–5	0–0	1–1	1–1	—	1–2
PSNI	2–2	0–3	0–3	0–4	1–4	—

Source: NIFL
Legend: Blue = home team win; Yellow = draw; Red = away team win.

== Play-offs ==
=== NIFL Premiership play-offs ===
See: 2018–19 NIFL Premiership

=== NIFL Championship play-off ===
The eleventh-placed team from the Championship, PSNI, faced Annagh United, the runners-up from the 2018–19 Premier Intermediate League over two legs for one spot in the 2019–20 NIFL Championship. PSNI won 5–3 on aggregate to retain their place in the Championship for next season. Annagh United remained in the Premier Intermediate League.

30 April 2019
19:45 BST
First leg

Annagh United	1 – 4	PSNI
McDonald 30'	NIFL	Wilson 44'; Moody 51'; Tumelty 65', 82'

Tandragee Road, Portadown
Referee: Ben McMaster

3 May 2019
18:30 BST
Second leg

PSNI	1 – 2	Annagh United

Newforge Lane, Belfast

PSNI won 5–3 on aggregate and retained their Championship status for the 2019–20 season.
