= Jonny Addis =

Northern Irish footballer (born 1992)

Personal information
- Full name: Jonathan Addis
- Date of birth: 27 September 1992 (age 34)
- Place of birth: Newry, Northern Ireland
- Position: Centre-back

Team information
- Current team: Ballymena United
- Number: 4

Senior career*
Years	Team	Apps	(Gls)
2011–2013	Carrick Rangers	11	(1)
2013–2018	Glentoran	167	(5)
2018–2021	Ballymena United	78	(6)
2021–2026	Cliftonville	173	(12)
- * Club domestic league appearances and goals as of 29 April 2026

Jonny Addis (born 27 September 1992) is a Northern Irish footballer who plays for Ballymena United in the NIFL Premiership.

== Club career ==
=== Carrick Rangers ===
In Addis' first season with Carrick Rangers, they finished top of the NIFL Championship and therefore were promoted to the NIFL Premiership. Although now an established centre-half, Addis played both up front and centre-half during his time at Carrick Rangers.

=== Glentoran ===
Glentoran announced the signing of Addis in June 2013. Addis was part of the Glentoran squad which won the 2014-15 Irish Cup, with Addis coming on as a substitute late in the final against Portadown. In July 2016, Addis signed a new two-year deal with Glentoran. He left the club in 2018.

=== Ballymena United ===
Ballymena United announced the signing of Addis on a two-year in May 2018. During his time at Ballymena, the Sky Blues made it to the 2018-19 League Cup Final, and were defeated 1-0 by Linfield. One year later, Addis' Ballymena side were defeated 2-1 by Cliftonville in a dramatic County Antrim Shield final in January 2020. Addis left Ballymena in 2021.

=== Cliftonville ===
Addis signed for Cliftonville in the summer of 2021, and quickly became a fan favourite due to impressive performances. He scored his first goal for the Reds in October 2021 in a NIFL League Cup fixture against Ards. On 26 February 2022, Addis scored his first Irish League goal for Cliftonville against Crusaders in the North Belfast Derby. Johnny in May 2025, who has his own Cliftonville Fc supporters club, signed a new contract with Cliftonville, reaffirming his status as a fan's favourite and a goliath at the heart of the Red's defence.

== Career statistics ==
=== Club ===
As of 10 August 2024

Appearances and goals by club, season and competition
Club	Season	League			National Cup		League Cup		Continental		Other		Total	
Club	Season	Division	Apps	Goals	Apps	Goals	Apps	Goals	Apps	Goals	Apps	Goals	Apps	Goals
Carrick Rangers	2011-12	NIFL Premiership	11	1	1	0	1	0	—		—		13	1
Carrick Rangers	2012-13	NIFL Premiership	—		—		1	0	—		—		1	0
Carrick Rangers	Total		11	1	1	0	2	0	—		—		14	1
Glentoran	2013-14	NIFL Premiership	27	0	2	0	1	0	—		—		30	0
Glentoran	2014-15	NIFL Premiership	34	1	4	0	2	0	—		2 (Note: Appearance(s) in Setanta Sports Cup)	0	42	1
Glentoran	2015-16	NIFL Premiership	35	2	1	0	2	1	2 (Note: Appearance(s) in UEFA Europa League)	0	0	0	40	3
Glentoran	2016-17	NIFL Premiership	36	1	—		—		—		—		36	1
Glentoran	2017-18	NIFL Premiership	35	1	1	0	1	0	—		—		37	1
Glentoran	Total		167	5	8	0	6	1	2	0	2	0	185	6
Ballymena United	2018-19	NIFL Premiership	32	3	2	0	3	0	—		—		37	3
Ballymena United	2019-20	NIFL Premiership	25	2	4	0	2	0	1	0	1 (Note: Appearance(s) in Scottish Challenge Cup)	0	33	2
Ballymena United	2020-21	NIFL Premiership	21	1	0	0	—		—		—		21	1
Ballymena United	Total		78	6	6	0	5	0	1	0	1	0	91	6
Cliftonville	2021-22	NIFL Premiership	38	1	3	0	4	1	—		—		45	2
Cliftonville	2022-23	NIFL Premiership	37	2	3	0	3	0	2 (Note: Appearance(s) in UEFA Europa Conference League)	0	1	1	46	3
Cliftonville	2023-24	NIFL Premiership	36	3	5	1	1	0	1	0	—		43	4
Cliftonville	2024-25	NIFL Premiership	0	0	—		—		2	0	1 (Note: Appearance(s) in NIFL Charity Shield)	0	3	0
Cliftonville	Total		111	6	11	1	8	1	5	0	2	1	137	9
Career Total			367	18	26	1	21	2	8	0	5	1	427	22

== Honours ==
Carrick Rangers

- NIFL Championship: 2010-11

Glentoran

- Irish Cup : 2014-15
- NIFL Charity Shield : 2015-16

Cliftonville

- Irish League Cup: 2021-22
- Irish Cup: 2023-24

Individual

- NIFL Premiership Team of the Year (2): 2021–22, 2023–24
