= 2021–22 Northern Ireland Football League Cup =

BetMcLean League Cup

Tournament details
- Country: Northern Ireland
- Dates: 31 Jul 2021 – 13 Mar 2022
- Teams: 35

Final positions
- Champions: Cliftonville (6th win)
- Runners-up: Coleraine

Tournament statistics
- Matches played: 34
- Goals scored: 149 (4.38 per match)

The 2021–22 Northern Ireland Football League Cup (known as the BetMcLean League Cup for sponsorship purposes) was the 35th edition of Northern Ireland's football knockout cup competition for national league clubs, and the seventh edition of the competition as the Northern Ireland Football League Cup. The competition was contested by the 35 member clubs of the Northern Ireland Football League, commencing on 31 July 2021 with the first round and concluding with the final on 13 March 2022. The competition was sponsored by McLean Bookmakers, the title sponsors of the cup since the 2017–18 season.

The cup returned this season after a one-year hiatus, following the cancellation of the 2020–21 competition due to the COVID-19 pandemic in Northern Ireland. Coleraine were the defending champions from the 2019–20 season, after a 2–1 win over Crusaders in the 2020 final secured their second League Cup win overall; their first in 32 years. Coleraine once again reached the final this season, however they were defeated 4–3 in extra time by Cliftonville, who won the League Cup for the sixth time overall, and the first time since their fourth consecutive cup win in 2016. This season saw the final being played on a Sunday for the first time in the competition's history, attracting a League Cup final record crowd of 11,103 at Windsor Park. This also became the highest scoring final in the cup's history. Coleraine suffered defeat in a League Cup final for the sixth time, a joint record with Crusaders for the most final defeats.

== Format and schedule ==
The competition was open to the 35 members of the Northern Ireland Football League (NIFL). Usually, the 16 highest-ranked clubs from the previous league season are exempt from entering until the second round, where they are seeded to avoid being drawn against each other. However, as the 2020–21 second and third tier league seasons were cancelled as a result of the COVID-19 pandemic in Northern Ireland, the rankings from the 2019–20 season were used instead. This consisted of all twelve 2019–20 NIFL Premiership clubs, along with the top four clubs from the 2019–20 NIFL Championship. The remaining 19 NIFL clubs entered the draw for the first round, with six of them being randomly drawn to face each other in three first round matches, and 13 of them receiving byes into the second round. The three first round winners and the 13 teams given byes made up the 16 unseeded clubs in the second round.

From the third round onwards, the competition was operated in a straight knockout format with no seeding. Replays were not used in the competition, with all matches using extra time and penalties to determine the winner if necessary.

| Round | First match date | Fixtures | Clubs |
|---|---|---|---|
| First round | 31 July 2021 | 3 | 35 → 32 |
| Second round | 14 September 2021 | 16 | 32 → 16 |
| Third round | 13 October 2021 | 8 | 16 → 8 |
| Quarter-finals | 9 November 2021 | 4 | 8 → 4 |
| Semi-finals | 14 December 2021 | 2 | 4 → 2 |
| Final | 13 March 2022 | 1 | 2 → 1 |

== Results ==
The league tier of each club at the time of entering the competition is listed in parentheses.

(1) = NIFL Premiership
(2) = NIFL Championship
(3) = NIFL Premier Intermediate League

=== First round ===
The first round draw was made on 9 July 2021. The matches were played on 31 July and 3 August 2021.

| Team 1 | Score | Team 2 |
|---|---|---|
31 July 2021
| **Ballyclare Comrades (2)** | 2–1 | Queen's University (2) |
| **Newry City (2)** | 2–1 | Tobermore United (3) |
3 August 2021
| **Annagh United (2)** | 4–1 | Knockbreda (2) |

=== Second round ===
The second round draw was made on 13 August 2021. The matches were played on 14 and 15 September 2021. The top 16 league clubs from the previous season were seeded in this round in order to avoid drawing each other.

| Team 1 | Score | Team 2 |
|---|---|---|
14 September 2021
| Annagh United (2) | 2–4 | **Ballymena United (1)** |
| Ballyclare Comrades (2) | 0–4 | **Linfield (1)** |
| Bangor (3) | 0–5 | **Coleraine (1)** |
| **Carrick Rangers (1)** | 2–1 (a.e.t.) | Dergview (2) |
| **Cliftonville (1)** | 2–0 | Harland & Wolff Welders (2) |
| **Crusaders (1)** | 5–0 | Moyola Park (3) |
| Dundela (2) | 0–4 (a.e.t.) | **Ballinamallard United (2)** |
| **Dungannon Swifts (1)** | 3–0 | Armagh City (3) |
| **Glenavon (1)** | 5–1 | Portstewart (3) |
| **Glentoran (1)** | 5–0 | Banbridge Town (3) |
| Institute (2) | 4–3 | **PSNI (3)** |
| Larne (1) | 4–0 | **Limavady United (3)** |
| **Loughgall (2)** | 6–2 | Lisburn Distillery (3) |
| Newry City (2) | 1–2 (a.e.t.) | **Warrenpoint Town (1)** |
| **Portadown (1)** | 2–0 | Newington (3) |
15 September 2021
| **Ards (2)** | 4–0 | Dollingstown (3) |

1. Institute were later dismissed from the competition for fielding an ineligible player in this match. PSNI were reinstated to the third round instead.
2. Larne were later dismissed from the competition for fielding an ineligible player in this match. Limavady United were reinstated to the third round instead.

| Seeded | Unseeded |
|---|---|
| **Ards (2)**; **Ballinamallard United (2)**; **Ballymena United (1)**; **Carrick Rangers (1)**; **Cliftonville (1)**; **Coleraine (1)**; **Crusaders (1)**; **Dungannon Swifts (1)**; **Glenavon (1)**; **Glentoran (1)**; Institute (2); Larne (1); **Linfield (1)**; **Loughgall (2)**; **Portadown (1)**; **Warrenpoint Town (1)** | Annagh United (2); Armagh City (3); Ballyclare Comrades (2); Banbridge Town (3); Bangor (3); Dergview (2); Dollingstown (3); Dundela (2); Harland & Wolff Welders (2); **Limavady United (3)**; Lisburn Distillery (3); Moyola Park (3); Newington (3); Newry City (2); Portstewart (3); **PSNI (3)** |
Clubs in **bold** = Second round winners

=== Third round ===
The third round draw was made on 16 September 2021. The matches were played on 13 and 26 October, and 2 November 2021.

| Team 1 | Score | Team 2 |
|---|---|---|
13 October 2021
| Carrick Rangers (1) | 0–2 | **Coleraine (1)** |
| Crusaders (1) | 2–3 (a.e.t.) | **Ballymena United (1)** |
| Glenavon (1) | 2–2 (a.e.t.) (4–5 p) | **Glentoran (1)** |
| **Warrenpoint Town (1)** | 1–0 | Loughgall (2) |
26 October 2021
| Ards (2) | 1–4 | **Cliftonville (1)** |
| **Portadown (1)** | 1–0 | Ballinamallard United (2) |
2 November 2021
| **Limavady United (3)** | 3–2 | Dungannon Swifts (1) |
| **Linfield (1)** | 11–0 | PSNI (3) |

=== Quarter-finals ===
The draw was made on 16 October 2021. The quarter-finals were played on 9 November 2021.

| Team 1 | Score | Team 2 |
|---|---|---|
| **Ballymena United (1)** | 3–1 | Linfield (1) |
| **Coleraine (1)** | 2–0 | Glentoran (1) |
| Portadown (1) | 1–2 (a.e.t.) | **Cliftonville (1)** |
| **Warrenpoint Town (1)** | 6–1 | Limavady United (3) |

=== Semi-finals ===
The semi-finals were played on 14 December 2021.

| Team 1 | Score | Team 2 |
|---|---|---|
| **Cliftonville (1)** | 3–0 | Ballymena United (1) |
| **Coleraine (1)** | 6–1 | Warrenpoint Town (1) |

=== Final ===
The final was played on 13 March 2022 at Windsor Park, Belfast. This was the first League Cup final ever played on a Sunday.

13 March 2022
15:00 GMT

| Cliftonville (1) | 4 – 3 (a.e.t.) | Coleraine (1) |
|---|---|---|
| Gormley 74', 107'; O'Neill 90', 104' | NIFL | Shevlin 58'; Lowry 63'; Allen 120'; McLaughlin (red card) 92' |

Windsor Park, Belfast
Attendance: 11,103
Referee: Andrew Davey
