= 2019–20 NIFL Championship =

NIFL Championship
- Season: 2019–20
- Dates: 3 August 2019 – 10 March 2020
- Champions: Portadown
- Promoted: Portadown
- Relegated: PSNI
- Matches: 183
- Goals: 651 (3.56 per match)
- Biggest home win: Ballyclare Comrades 8–0; H&W Welders (13 August 2019)
- Biggest away win: Knockbreda 0–8 Ards (26 December 2019)
- Highest scoring: Ballinamallard United 6–4; PSNI (22 February 2020)

The 2019–20 NIFL Championship was the fourth season of the NIFL Championship since gaining senior status. It is the second-tier of the Northern Ireland Football League - the national football league in Northern Ireland. The season began on 3 August 2019 and was originally scheduled to conclude in April 2020, However, the season was suspended on 13 March 2020 as a result of the worldwide COVID-19 pandemic. No further fixtures were played, with the final games held on 10 March 2020 and the season being officially curtailed in June 2020.

Larne were the current champions. However, due to their promotion to the 2019–20 NIFL Premiership, they were unable to defend their title.

The Irish FA initially suspended all football-related activity in Northern Ireland until 4 April, with this suspension subsequently being extended first until 30 April, and then until 31 May. In June 2020, NIFL announced that the season was over, and that average points per game would be used to determine the final league standings. Portadown were declared champions, gaining promotion to the 2020–21 NIFL Premiership, while PSNI suffered relegation to the NIFL Premier Intermediate League. The promotion/relegation play-offs were cancelled, meaning 11th-placed Knockbreda were reprieved from relegation, and runners-up Ballinamallard United missed out on the chance of promotion.

== Teams ==
Locations of the 2019–20 NIFL Championship teams
Locations of the Belfast-based 2019–20 NIFL Championship teams

The 2019–20 NIFL Championship is being contested by 12 teams, nine of which retained their Championship status from the previous season. Larne were champions in the previous season, and were promoted to the 2019–20 NIFL Premiership. They were replaced by the bottom team in last season's Premiership, Newry City. Runners-up Carrick Rangers won 3–1 on aggregate in the promotion play-off against Ards, also achieving promotion to the Premiership for this season and relegating Ards to the Championship.

The bottom team from the previous season, Limavady United, were relegated to the third-tier NIFL Premier Intermediate League. They were replaced by Queen's University, winners of the Premier Intermediate League. The eleventh-placed team from the previous season, PSNI, remained in the Championship this season, after defeating the NIFL Premier Intermediate League runners-up Annagh United 5–3 on aggregate in the relegation play-off.

=== Stadia and locations ===
Club	Stadium	Location	Capacity
Ards	Bangor Fuels Arena	Bangor	1,895 (500 seated)
Ballinamallard United	Ferney Park	Ballinamallard	2,000 (250 seated)
Ballyclare Comrades	Dixon Park	Ballyclare	5,333
Dergview	Darragh Park	Castlederg	1,200
Dundela	Wilgar Park	Belfast	2,500
Harland & Wolff Welders	Tillysburn Park	Belfast	3,000
Knockbreda	Breda Park	Belfast	1,000
Loughgall	Lakeview Park	Loughgall	3,000
Newry City	The Showgrounds	Newry	2,275 (1,080 seated)
Portadown	Shamrock Park	Portadown	3,940 (2,765 seated)
PSNI	Newforge Lane	Belfast	1,500
Queen's University	Upper Malone	Belfast	1,000 (330 seated)

== League table ==
Pos	Team	Pld	W	D	L	GF	GA	GD	Pts	PPG	Promotion, qualification or relegation (Note: The season was curtailed due to the COVID-19 pandemic. Standings were decided by a points per game average.)
1	Portadown (C, P)	31	20	6	5	72	30	+42	66	2.13	Promotion to the NIFL Premiership
2	Ballinamallard United (Note: The promotion play-off was cancelled due to the COVID-19 pandemic. Ballinamallard United remained in the NIFL Championship.)	30	19	3	8	71	34	+37	60	2.00	
3	Loughgall	31	18	4	9	64	45	+19	58	1.87	
4	Ards	31	16	6	9	68	44	+24	54	1.74	
5	Newry City	30	15	6	9	55	32	+23	51	1.70	
6	Dundela	31	13	7	11	43	49	−6	46	1.48	
7	Ballyclare Comrades	30	11	7	12	53	49	+4	40	1.33	
8	Harland & Wolff Welders	31	10	5	16	52	63	−11	35	1.13	
9	Queen's University	31	11	1	19	59	69	−10	34	1.10	
10	Dergview	30	8	5	17	38	54	−16	29	0.97	
11	Knockbreda (Note: The relegation play-off was cancelled due to the COVID-19 pandemic. Knockbreda were reprieved from relegation.)	30	7	4	19	36	84	−48	25	0.83	
12	PSNI (R)	30	7	2	21	40	98	−58	23	0.77	Relegation to the NIFL Premier Intermediate League

Source: NIFL
Rules for classification: 1) Points per game; 2) Goal difference; 3) Number of goals scored; 4) Head-to-head points; 5) Head-to-head goal difference; 6) Drawing of lots
(C) Champions; (P) Promoted; (R) Relegated

== Results ==
=== Matches 1–22 ===
During matches 1–22 each team played every other team twice (home and away).

Home \ Away	ARD	BMD	BCC	DGV	DUN	HAR	KNB	LGL	NEW	POR	PSN	QUE
Ards	—	3–2	2–0	5–2	1–1	1–0	2–3	3–0	0–3	2–4	3–0	3–2
Ballinamallard United	1–1	—	5–0	2–1	4–0	4–2	0–1	2–3	0–1	4–2	5–0	2–0
Ballyclare Comrades	1–1	2–0	—	1–1	0–1	8–0	4–0	4–5	0–1	0–1	1–2	3–2
Dergview	3–1	2–0	1–1	—	0–2	0–3	3–1	1–2	1–2	1–2	2–4	3–2
Dundela	0–3	0–4	0–0	1–0	—	3–2	5–0	1–3	1–1	1–1	5–2	3–1
Harland & Wolff Welders	1–2	0–2	3–0	2–2	1–2	—	2–3	1–2	2–0	2–1	2–2	2–1
Knockbreda	0–1	1–4	1–3	1–1	0–2	2–2	—	3–0	1–4	0–5	1–1	1–3
Loughgall	0–3	1–2	1–4	2–1	0–0	4–1	0–3	—	1–0	0–0	6–0	0–1
Newry City	5–1	1–3	5–1	1–2	4–0	1–2	2–2	3–4	—	1–2	1–2	1–0
Portadown	2–1	0–1	5–0	2–0	2–0	2–0	3–0	2–1	0–0	—	5–0	3–1
PSNI	0–4	0–4	2–6	3–1	0–1	1–4	3–2	1–4	1–6	0–1	—	5–3
Queen's University	3–1	0–2	1–2	2–1	5–2	5–2	3–2	0–4	1–3	3–3	5–1	—

Source: NIFL Championship
Legend: Blue = home team win; Yellow = draw; Red = away team win.
For upcoming matches, an "a" indicates there is an article about the rivalry between the two participants.
1. NIFL awarded results as 3–0 wins to Ards and Knockbreda against Loughgall, after Loughgall fielded an ineligible player in both matches.

=== Matches 23–33 ===
During matches 23–33 each team was scheduled to play every other team for the third time (either at home, or away). However, some fixtures did not take place, after the league season was curtailed as a result of the COVID-19 pandemic.

Home \ Away	ARD	BMD	BCC	DGV	DUN	HAR	KNB	LGL	NEW	POR	PSN	QUE
Ards	—	—	2–2	3–1	—	1–2	—	—	—	1–1	0–1	—
Ballinamallard United	2–2	—	—	3–0	1–0	—	—	1–2	—	—	6–4	—
Ballyclare Comrades	—	—	—	2–0	—	—	0–1	1–1	1–1	—	—	2–0
Dergview	—	—	—	—	1–0	—	—	—	—	3–1	—	2–0
Dundela	1–5	—	4–2	—	—	1–0	—	1–1	0–0	—	—	—
Harland & Wolff Welders	—	1–2	—	1–1	—	—	—	—	—	2–4	3–1	—
Knockbreda	0–8	—	—	—	—	2–6	—	—	—	—	4–2	—
Loughgall	—	—	—	2–1	—	3–1	4–0	—	—	0–2	—	—
Newry City	—	1–0	—	—	—	0–0	3–1	0–3	—	—	3–0	—
Portadown	—	3–3	0–2	—	—	—	4–0	—	—	—	—	7–1
PSNI	—	—	—	—	2–4	—	—	—	—	0–2	—	0–4
Queen's University	1–2	—	—	—	3–1	—	4–0	2–5	0–1	—	—	—

Source: NIFL Championship
Legend: Blue = home team win; Yellow = draw; Red = away team win.
For upcoming matches, an "a" indicates there is an article about the rivalry between the two participants.
