= 2022–23 Cliftonville F.C. season =

Cliftonville
2022–23 season
- Chairman: Paul McKeown
- Manager: Paddy McLaughlin
- Stadium: Solitude, Belfast
- Top goalscorer: League: Ryan Curran (11); All: Ryan Curran (13)

The 2022–23 season is Cliftonville's 122nd season in the top flight of the Northern Ireland Football League having never been relegated since the league's formation in 1890. In addition to the domestic league, they will also compete in the Irish Cup, the League Cup and the County Antrim Shield.

== Pre-season and friendlies ==
Cliftonville F.C. played a total of eight pre-season friendlies including one against Shamrock Rovers F.C. Their main results are shown in the table below.

Date	Opponents	H/A	Result F-A	Scorers
11 June 2022	Derry City	A	1-2	Ronan Hale
18 June 2022	Shamrock Rovers	H	0-1	
25 June 2022	Bala Town	A	1-2	Jonny Addis
26 June 2022	The New Saints	A	1-2	Ronan Hale
6 August 2022	Ballymena	A	0-2	

== Competitions ==
=== Overall Record ===
Competition	First Match	Last Match	Starting Round	Final Position	Record							
Competition	First Match	Last Match	Starting Round	Final Position	Pld	W	D	L	GF	GA	GD	Win %
NIFL Premiership	14 August 2022	29 April 2023	Matchday 1		23	15	4	4	41	29	12	65%
Irish Cup	6 January 2023	5th Round; Won 5–0 (v. Dundela F.C.)	5th Round		1	1	0	0	5	0	5	100%
NIFL League Cup	13 September 2022	Semi-Final	1st Round	Lost 3–2 (v. Coleraine F.C.)	4	3	0	1	14	5	9	75%
County Antrim Shield	6 September 2022	Semi-Final	1st Round		0	0	0	0	0	0	0	66%
Total					28	19	4	5	60	34	26	68%

== Transfers ==
=== In ===
Date	Pos.	Name	From	Fee	Ref.
1 July 2022	GK	(Northern Ireland) Nathan Gartside	Derry City F.C.	Free	
1 July 2022	DF	(Northern Ireland) Danny Purkis	Coleraine F.C.	Undisclosed	
1 July 2022	DF	(Republic of Ireland) Luke Turner	Aberdeen F.C.	Free	
1 July 2022	MF	(Republic of Ireland) Stephen Mallon	Bohemians F.C.	Free	
1 July 2022	FW	(Republic of Ireland) Ronan Hale	Larne F.C.	Undisclosed	
1 July 2022	FW	(Northern Ireland) Gerard Storey	Derry City F.C.	Undisclosed	
1 January 2023	GK	(Northern Ireland) Gerard Doherty	Finn Harps F.C.	Undisclosed	

=== On Loan ===
Pos.	Name	On Loan From	From	Until
GK	(Northern Ireland) David Parkhouse	Finn Harps F.C.	10 January 2023	1 July 2023
GK	(England) Fynn Talley	Brighton & Hove Albion F.C.	1 July 2022	1 July 2023

=== Out ===
Date	Pos.	Name	To	Fee	Ref.
1 July 2022	DF	(Republic of Ireland) Ryan O'Reilly	Released	N/A	
1 July 2022	DF	(Northern Ireland) Jamie Harney	Released	N/A	
1 July 2022	DF	(Northern Ireland) Seanna Foster	Bangor F.C.	Free	
1 July 2022	DF	(Northern Ireland) Conor McDermott	Coleraine F.C.	Undisclosed	
1 July 2022	DF	(Northern Ireland) Aaron Donnelly	Larne F.C.	Undisclosed	
1 July 2022	MF	(Northern Ireland) Liam Bagnall	Released	N/A	
1 July 2022	MF	(Republic of Ireland) Daniel Kearns	Larne F.C.	Undisclosed	
1 July 2022	FW	(Northern Ireland) Paul O'Neill	Larne F.C.	Undisclosed	
1 July 2022	FW	(Northern Ireland) Michael McCrudden	Coleraine F.C.	Undisclosed	
