= Ryan Curran =

Irish footballer

Personal information
- Date of birth: 13 October 1993 (age 33)
- Place of birth: Derry, Northern Ireland
- Height: 1.78 m (5 ft 10 in)
- Position: Forward

Team information
- Current team: Cliftonville
- Number: 9

Senior career*
Years	Team	Apps	(Gls)
2011–2015	Derry City	68	(4)
2012	→ Finn Harps (loan)	2	(0)
2016–2017	Finn Harps	30	(7)
2017–2018	Ballinamallard United	46	(16)
2018–	Cliftonville	242	(84)
- * Club domestic league appearances and goals as of 29 April 2026

Ryan Curran (born 13 October 1993) is a footballer from Northern Ireland who plays for Cliftonville in the NIFL Premiership.

== Club career ==
=== Early career ===
Curran began his senior career at Derry City, making eleven appearances before being sent out on loan to Finn Harps in August 2012. He only made two appearances for Harps before returning to Derry City in the same month.

=== Return to Derry City ===
After returning from a loan spell at Finn Harps, Curran made 72 appearances for Derry City, netting five goals. He was part of the squad that won the 2012 FAI Cup, before returning to Finn Harps in 2015.

=== Finn Harps ===
Curran signed for then newly promoted League Of Ireland side Finn Harps in 2015. On 10 May 2016, Curran scored in a 2–2 draw against his former club, Derry City. Harps finished 10th in the table, and Curran left for then NIFL Premiership outfit Ballinamallard United in January 2017.

=== Ballinamallard United ===
In his first season at Ballinamallard United, Curran made 10 appearances, scoring twice. He suffered a persistent ankle injury problem throughout his early career and it affected him at the beginning of his time at Ballinamallard. In March 2017, He played his first full 90 minutes for Ballinamallard in a match against Ards. Curran scored 16 goals for Ballinamallard in the 2017/18 season before they were relegated on the final day. He left Ballinamallard for Cliftonville in May 2018.

=== Cliftonville ===
Cliftonville announced the signing of Curran on 4 May 2018. He made his debut in a Europa League qualifier against Danish Superliga side FC Nordsjælland in July 2018. In Curran's first season with the Reds, he won the Cliftonville Players' Player of the Year and the Cliftonville Player of the Year. In January 2020, Curran scored a last-minute winner in a dramatic County Antrim Shield final comeback against Ballymena, winning his first trophy with the club. On 13 March 2022, Curran put in a man of the match display during which Cliftonville won their sixth Irish League Cup, defeating Coleraine at Windsor Park.

== Career statistics ==
As of 10 August 2024

Appearances and goals by club, season and competition
Club	Season	League			National Cup		League Cup		Continental		Other		Total	
Club	Season	Division	Apps	Goals	Apps	Goals	Apps	Goals	Apps	Goals	Apps	Goals	Apps	Goals
Derry City	2011	League of Ireland Premier Division	—		—		1	0	—		—		1	0
Derry City	2012	League of Ireland Premier Division	13	1	2	1	2	0	—		1 (Note: Appearance(s) in Setanta Sports Cup)	0	18	2
Derry City	2013	League of Ireland Premier Division	15	0	1	0	1	0	0	0	2	0	19	0
Derry City	2014	League of Ireland Premier Division	20	1	0	0	1	0	0	0	—		21	1
Derry City	2015	League of Ireland Premier Division	20	2	2	0	2	0	—		—		24	2
Derry City	Total		68	4	5	1	7	0	0	0	3	0	83	5
Finn Harps (loan)	2012	League of Ireland First Division	2	0	—		—		—		—		2	0
Finn Harps	2016	League of Ireland Premier Division	30	7	—		2	0	—		—		32	7
Ballinamallard United	2017–18	NIFL Premiership	34	14	1	0	1	0	—		—		36	14
Cliftonville	2018–19	NIFL Premiership	37	14	—		1	0	2 (Note: Appearance(s) in UEFA Europa League)	0	—		40	14
Cliftonville	2019–20	NIFL Premiership	31	5	3	2	2	0	3	0	—		39	7
Cliftonville	2020–21	NIFL Premiership	39	15	2	1	—		—		—		41	16
Cliftonville	2021–22	NIFL Premiership	38	19	3	0	4	3	—		—		45	22
Cliftonville	2022–23	NIFL Premiership	28	15	1	0	3	0	2 (Note: Appearance(s) in UEFA Europa Conference League)	0	1 (Note: Appearance(s) in Scottish Challenge Cup)	0	35	15
Cliftonville	2023–24	NIFL Premiership	0	0	—		—		—		—		0	0
Cliftonville	2024–25	NIFL Premiership	0	0	—		—		2	0	1 (Note: Appearance(s) in NIFL Charity Shield)	0	3	0
Cliftonville	Total		173	68	9	3	10	3	9	0	2	0	203	74
Career total			307	93	15	4	20	3	9	0	5	0	356	100

== Honours ==
Derry City

- FAI Cup: 2012

Cliftonville

- County Antrim Shield: 2019–20
- Irish League Cup: 2021–22
