= Stuart King (footballer) =

Northern Irish footballer

Personal information
- Full name: Stuart King
- Date of birth: 20 March 1981 (age 45)
- Place of birth: Derry, Northern Ireland
- Position: Midfielder

Senior career*
Years	Team	Apps	(Gls)
1998–2001	Preston North End	0	(0)
2000	→ Raith Rovers (loan)		
2001	→ Queen of the South (loan)		
2001–2002	Southend United		
2002–2005	Linfield		
2005–2009	Ballymena United	95 (17)	(11)
2009–2014	Glenavon		
2014–2015	Larne		
2015–2016	Ballyclare Comrades		
2016–2019	Banbridge Town		
- * Club domestic league appearances and goals

Stuart King (born 20 March 1981) is a current Northern Irish professional manager who, in his playing career, played as a Midfielder.

He began his career at Preston North End, but was released in 2001 and signed for Southend United, after a couple of loans at Raith Rovers and Queen of the South.. From there he had a varied career, playing for Ballyclare Comrades, Ballymena United, Banbridge Town, Glenavon, Harland and Wolff Welders, Larne and Linfield.

Stuart King is the current manager of NIFL Championship club Newry City AFC.
