= 2011–12 Bristol City F.C. season =

Bristol City
2011–12 season
- Chairman: Colin Sexstone
- Manager: Derek McInnes
- Stadium: Ashton Gate Stadium
- Championship: 20th
- FA Cup: Third round
- Football League Cup: First round
- Top goalscorer: League: Jon Stead (9); All: Jon Stead (9)
- Highest home attendance: 19,003 vs. Coventry City, 9 April 2012
- Lowest home attendance: 7,708 vs. Swindon Town, 24 August 2011
- Average home league attendance: 16,018
Home colours	Away colours

The 2011–12 season was the 114th season of professional association football played by Bristol City F.C., an association football club based in Bristol, England. They competed in the Championship, alongside the FA Cup, the Football League Cup and the Football League Trophy.

== League table ==
Pos	Team	Pld	W	D	L	GF	GA	GD	Pts	Promotion or relegation
18	Peterborough United	46	13	11	22	67	77	−10	50	
19	Nottingham Forest	46	14	8	24	48	63	−15	50	
20	Bristol City	46	12	13	21	44	68	−24	49	
21	Barnsley	46	13	9	24	49	74	−25	48	
22	Portsmouth (R)	46	13	11	22	50	59	−9	40 (Note: Portsmouth were deducted 10 points for entering administration.)	Relegation to League One

Updated to match(es) played on 28 April 2012. Source: BBC Sport
Rules for classification: 1) points; 2) goal difference; 3) number of goals scored.
(R) Relegated

== Squad ==
Note: Flags indicate national team as defined under FIFA eligibility rules; some limited exceptions apply. Players may hold more than one non-FIFA nationality.

No.	Pos.	Nation	Player
4	DF	ENG	Liam Fontaine
5	DF	WAL	Lewin Nyatanga
6	DF	SCO	Louis Carey (captain)
7	MF	ENG	Marvin Elliott
8	MF	AUS	Neil Kilkenny
9	FW	ENG	Jon Stead
11	MF	ENG	Martyn Woolford
12	FW	ENG	Ryan Taylor
14	MF	ENG	Cole Skuse
15	MF	ENG	Bobby Reid
17	MF	FRA	Yannick Bolasie
18	DF	WAL	James Wilson
21	DF	MLI	Kalifa Cissé
22	GK	ENG	Dean Gerken

No.	Pos.	Nation	Player
23	DF	ENG	Joe Edwards (on loan to Yeovil Town)
26	DF	SCO	Richard Foster
27	MF	GHA	Albert Adomah
29	DF	ENG	Aaron Amadi-Holloway
31	MF	ENG	Joe Bryan
32	GK	ENG	Lewis Carey
34	FW	Jersey	Brett Pitman
35	DF	JAM	Damion Stewart (on loan at Notts County)
37	MF	SCO	Stephen Pearson

=== Statistics ===
As of 29 April 2012

No.	Pos	Nat	Player	Total		Championship		FA Cup		League Cup	
No.	Pos	Nat	Player	Apps	Goals	Apps	Goals	Apps	Goals	Apps	Goals
1	GK	(England) ENG	David James	37	0	35+0	0	1+0	0	0+1	0
3	DF	(Scotland) SCO	Jamie McAllister	13	0	11+1	0	0+0	0	1+0	0
4	DF	(England) ENG	Liam Fontaine	25	0	25+0	0	0+0	0	0+0	0
5	DF	(Wales) WAL	Lewin Nyatanga	31	0	28+1	0	1+0	0	1+0	0
6	DF	(Scotland) SCO	Louis Carey	20	0	17+2	0	1+0	0	0+0	0
7	MF	(England) ENG	Marvin Elliott	27	2	27+0	2	0+0	0	0+0	0
8	MF	(Australia) AUS	Neil Kilkenny	41	1	31+8	1	1+0	0	1+0	0
9	FW	(England) ENG	Jon Stead	25	6	16+8	6	0+0	0	0+1	0
10	MF	(England) ENG	Hogan Ephraim	5	1	3+2	1	0+0	0	0+0	0
11	MF	(England) ENG	Martyn Woolford	27	1	11+14	1	1+0	0	1+0	0
12	FW	(England) ENG	Ryan Taylor	8	1	0+7	1	0+0	0	1+0	0
14	MF	(England) ENG	Cole Skuse	38	2	36+0	2	1+0	0	1+0	0
15	MF	(England) ENG	Bobby Reid	0	0	0+0	0	0+0	0	0+0	0
16	FW	(Scotland) SCO	David Clarkson	5	0	0+4	0	0+1	0	0+0	0
17	MF	(Democratic Republic of the Congo) COD	Yannick Bolasie	23	1	7+15	1	0+1	0	0+0	0
18	DF	(Wales) WAL	James Wilson	22	0	14+6	0	1+0	0	1+0	0
19	DF	(Wales) WAL	Christian Ribeiro	0	0	0+0	0	0+0	0	0+0	0
20	MF	(Jamaica) JAM	Jamal Campbell-Ryce	18	0	12+5	0	0+0	0	1+0	0
21	DF	(Mali) MLI	Kalifa Cissé	31	2	25+6	2	0+0	0	0+0	0
22	GK	(England) ENG	Dean Gerken	11	0	10+0	0	0+0	0	1+0	0
23	DF	(England) ENG	Joe Edwards	2	0	1+1	0	0+0	0	0+0	0
24	FW	(England) ENG	Marlon Jackson	0	0	0+0	0	0+0	0	0+0	0
25	DF	(England) ENG	Danny Ball	0	0	0+0	0	0+0	0	0+0	0
26	DF	(Scotland) SCO	Richard Foster	19	0	19+0	0	0+0	0	0+0	0
27	MF	(England) ENG	Albert Adomah	46	5	38+6	5	1+0	0	0+1	0
31	MF	(England) ENG	Joe Bryan	1	0	1+0	0	0+0	0	0+0	0
32	GK	(England) ENG	Lewis Carey	0	0	0+0	0	0+0	0	0+0	0
34	FW	(England) ENG	Brett Pitman	36	7	12+22	7	0+1	0	1+0	0
35	DF	(Jamaica) JAM	Damion Stewart	3	0	3+0	0	0+0	0	0+0	0
36	DF	(Northern Ireland) NIR	Ryan McGivern	30	0	25+4	0	1+0	0	0+0	0
37	MF	(Scotland) SCO	Stephen Pearson	28	3	27+0	3	1+0	0	0+0	0
38	DF	(Israel) ISR	Dekel Keinan	1	0	0+1	0	0+0	0	0+0	0
39	FW	(New Zealand) NZL	Chris Wood	18	3	12+6	3	0+0	0	0+0	0
Players featured for club who have left:
	DF	(Cameroon) CMR	André Amougou	7	0	7+0	0	0+0	0	0+0	0
	MF	(England) ENG	Sean Davis	3	0	2+1	0	0+0	0	0+0	0
	MF	(England) ENG	Lee Johnson	0	0	0+0	0	0+0	0	0+0	0
	DF	(England) ENG	Nicky Hunt	0	0	0+0	0	0+0	0	0+0	0
	FW	(England) ENG	Nicky Maynard	28	8	26+1	8	1+0	0	0+0	0
	DF	(Scotland) SCO	Stephen McManus	5	0	5+0	0	0+0	0	0+0	0
	DF	(England) ENG	Jordan Spence	11	0	9+1	0	0+0	0	1+0	0
	GK	(England) ENG	David James	39	37	38+0	36+0	1+0	1+0		

==== Goalscoring record ====
No.	Po.	Name	Championship	FA Cup	League Cup	Total
~~10~~	FW	Nicky Maynard	8	0	0	8
34	FW	Brett Pitman	7	0	0	7
9	FW	Jon Stead	6	0	0	6
27	FW	Albert Adomah	5	0	0	5
37	MF	Stephen Pearson	3	0	0	3
39	FW	Chris Wood	3	0	0	3
14	MF	Cole Skuse	2	0	0	3
21	MF	Kalifa Cissé	2	0	0	2
7	MF	Marvin Elliott	2	0	0	2
10	MF	Hogan Ephraim	1	0	0	1
17	MF	Yannick Bolasie	1	0	0	1
8	MF	Neil Kilkenny	1	0	0	1
12	FW	Ryan Taylor	1	0	0	1
11	MF	Martyn Woolford	1	0	0	1
Total			42	0	0	42

==== Disciplinary record ====
No.	Pos.	Name	Championship		FA Cup		League Cup		Total	
No.	Pos.	Name	Booked	Sent off (straight red)	Booked	Sent off (straight red)	Booked	Sent off (straight red)	Booked	Sent off (straight red)
37	MF	Stephen Pearson	4	0	1	1	0	0	5	1
34	FW	Brett Pitman	5	1	0	0	0	0	5	1
6	DF	Louis Carey	4	1	0	0	0	0	4	1
36	DF	Ryan McGivern	4	1	0	0	0	0	4	1
18	DF	James Wilson	4	1	0	0	0	0	4	1
4	DF	Liam Fontaine	3	1	0	0	0	0	3	1
17	MF	Yannick Bolasie	1	1	0	0	0	0	1	1
9	FW	Jon Stead	6	0	0	0	0	0	6	0
14	MF	Cole Skuse	5	0	0	0	0	0	5	0
27	FW	Albert Adomah	4	0	0	0	0	0	4	0
21	MF	Kalifa Cissé	4	0	0	0	0	0	4	0
26	DF	Richard Foster	4	0	0	0	0	0	4	0
8	MF	Neil Kilkenny	4	0	0	0	0	0	4	0
3	DF	Jamie McAllister	4	0	0	0	0	0	4	0
~~10~~	FW	Nicky Maynard	3	0	0	0	0	0	3	0
33	DF	André Amougou	2	0	0	0	0	0	2	0
~~10~~	MF	Sean Davis	2	0	0	0	0	0	2	0
28	DF	Stephen McManus	2	0	0	0	0	0	2	0
2	DF	Jordan Spence	2	0	0	0	0	0	2	0
11	MF	Martyn Woolford	1	0	0	0	1	0	2	0
20	MF	Jamal Campbell-Ryce	1	0	0	0	0	0	1	0
23	DF	Joe Edwards	1	0	0	0	0	0	1	0
7	MF	Marvin Elliott	1	0	0	0	0	0	1	0
4	DF	Liam Fontaine	1	0	0	0	0	0	1	0
22	GK	Dean Gerken	1	0	0	0	0	0	1	0
1	GK	David James	1	0	0	0	0	0	1	0
5	DF	Lewin Nyatanga	1	0	0	0	0	0	1	0
37	MF	Stephen Pearson	1	0	0	0	0	0	1	0
35	DF	Damion Stewart	1	0	0	0	0	0	1	0
Total			74	6	1	1	1	0	76	7

==== Suspensions served ====
Date	Matches Missed	Player	Reason	Opponents Missed		
7 January	1	Stephen Pearson	Sent Off vs. Crawley Town	Brighton & Hove Albion (A)		
28 January	3	Louis Carey	Sent Off vs. Reading	Leeds United (H), Hull City (A), Crystal Palace (H)		
4 February	1	Yannick Bolasie	Sent Off vs. Leeds United	Hull City (A)		
4 February	3	James Wilson	Sent Off vs. Leeds United	Hull City (A), Crystal Palace (H)		
20 March	3	Liam Fontaine	Sent Off vs. Watford	Middlesbrough (A), Derby (H), Nottm Forest (A)		
24 March	1	Ryan McGivern	Sent Off vs. Middlesbrough	Derby (H)		
9 April	3	Brett Pitman	Sent Off vs. Coventry	Birmingham	West Ham	Barnsley (H)

=== International call-ups ===
No.	P	Name	Country	Level	Caps	Goals	Notes
27	MF	Albert Adomah	Ghana	Senior	0	0	Called to play Nigeria (9 August) (Game postponed due to London Riots)
8	MF	Neil Kilkenny	Australia	Senior	1	0	Called to play Wales (10 August)
21	MF	Kalifa Cissé	Mali	Senior	0	0	Called to play Tunisia (10 August)
5	DF	Lewin Nyatanga	Wales	Senior	0	0	On standby to play Montenegro (2 September)
8	MF	Neil Kilkenny	Australia	Senior	0	0	Called to play Thailand (2 September)
27	MF	Albert Adomah	Ghana	Senior	0	0	Called to play Swaziland (2 September)
5	DF	Lewin Nyatanga	Wales	Senior	0	0	On standby to play England (6 September)
8	MF	Neil Kilkenny	Australia	Senior	0	0	Called to play Saudi Arabia (6 September)
27	MF	Albert Adomah	Ghana	Senior	0	0	Called to play Brazil (5 September)

== Results ==
=== Pre-season friendlies ===
12 July 2011	Bristol City	1–2	Charlton Athletic	Portugal
18:30	Stead 80'		Wright-Phillips 65'; Jackson 90'

15 July 2011	Plymouth Argyle	2–3	Bristol City	Home Park
19:45	Hughes-Mason 30'; Hitchock 77'		Maynard 20', 45'; Kilkenny 53'

16 July 2011	Torquay United	2–0	Bristol City	Plainmoor
15:00	Atieno 13'; Howe 53'			Attendance: 1,596

19 July 2011	Cheltenham Town	1–2	Bristol City	Abbey Business Stadium
19:45	Goulding 62' (pen.)		Maynard 8'; Elliott 24'	Attendance: 1,104

20 July 2011	Bath City	1–0	Bristol City	Twerton Park
19:45	Murray 58'			Attendance: 508

23 July 2011	Yeovil Town	1–0	Bristol City	Huish Park
15:00

26 July 2011	Forest Green Rovers	1–3	Bristol City	The New Lawn
19:45	Styche 54' (pen.)		Pitman 43', 58'; Clarkson 75'	Attendance: 1,175

30 July 2011	Bristol City	0–1	West Bromwich Albion	Ashton Gate Stadium
15:00			Dawson 89'	Attendance: 7,346

=== Championship ===
6 August 2011 1	Bristol City	0–3	Ipswich Town	Ashton Gate Stadium
15:00			Chopra 13', 60'; Martin 51'	Attendance: 13,107; Referee: Mark Haywood

14 August 2011 2	Cardiff City	3–1	Bristol City	Cardiff City Stadium
15:00	Hudson 18'; Conway 23'; Earnshaw 36'		Maynard 82'	Attendance: 22,639; Referee: Salisbury

17 August 2011 3	Leicester City	1–2	Bristol City	King Power Stadium
19:45	Nugent 56'		Maynard 5', 66'	Attendance: 20,794; Referee: Miller

20 August 2011 4	Bristol City	0–0	Portsmouth	Ashton Gate
15:00				Attendance: 12,496

27 August 2011 5	Doncaster Rovers	1–1	Bristol City	Keepmoat Stadium
15:00	Hayter 68'		Adomah 45'	Attendance: 7,778

10 September 2011 6	Bristol City	0–1	Brighton & Hove Albion	Ashton Gate Stadium
15:00			Barnes 80'	Attendance: 13,911

17 September 2011 7	Leeds United	2–1	Bristol City	Elland Road
15:00	Clayton 3'; McCormack 86'		Kilkenny 11'	Attendance: 22,655

24 September 2011 8	Bristol City	1–1	Hull City	Ashton Gate Stadium
15:00	Pitman 79'		Koren 56'	Attendance: 12,254

27 September 2011 9	Bristol City	2–3	Reading	Ashton Gate Stadium
19:45	Adomah 23'; Pitman 59'		McAnuff 72'; Le Fondre 75'; Manset 90+4'	Attendance: 12,018

1 October 2011 10	Blackpool	5–0	Bristol City	Bloomfield Road
15:00	Taylor-Fletcher 37'; Shelvey 66'; Bogdanović 83', 90+4'; Ormerod 90+2'			Attendance: 11,734

15 October 2011 11	Bristol City	1–2	Peterborough United	Ashton Gate Stadium
15:00	Elliott 82'		Boyd 51'; Tomlin 72'	Attendance: 13,115

18 October 2011 12	Crystal Palace	1–0	Bristol City	Selhurst Park
15:00	Murray 81' (pen.)			Attendance: 11,869

23 October 2011 13	Bristol City	0–2	Birmingham City	Ashton Gate Stadium
15:00			Burke 36', 90+5'	Attendance: 13,577

29 October 2011 14	Barnsley	1–2	Bristol City	Oakwell
15:00	Davies 74'		Adomah 14'; Maynard 90+2'	Attendance: 8,900

1 November 2011 15	West Ham United	0–0	Bristol City	Boleyn Ground
19:45				Attendance: 27,980

5 November 2011 16	Bristol City	3–1	Burnley	Ashton Gate Stadium
15:00	Pearson 42'; Pitman 61'; Adomah 73'		Wallace 46'	Attendance: 12,187

20 November 2011 17	Millwall	1–2	Bristol City	The Den
13:15	Simpson 57'		Maynard 14', 63'	Attendance: 10,252

26 November 2011 18	Bristol City	2–0	Southampton	Ashton Gate Stadium
15:00	Adomah 48'; Maynard 84'			Attendance: 16, 346

29 November 2011 19	Watford	2–2	Bristol City	Vicarage Road
19:45	Dickinson 25'; Beattie 42'		Elliott 44' Mariappa (OG) 46'	Attendance: 12,148

3 December 2011 20	Bristol City	0–1	Middlesbrough	Ashton Gate Stadium
17:20			Martin 90+1'	Attendance: 14,467

10 December 2011 21	Derby County	2–1	Bristol City	Pride Park Stadium
15:00	Bryson 64'; Ball 73'		Woolford 56'	Attendance: 23,906

17 December 2011 22	Bristol City	0–0	Nottingham Forest	Ashton Gate Stadium
15:00				Attendance: 13,121

26 December 2011 23	Coventry City	1–0	Bristol City	Ricoh Arena
15:00	Deegan 72'			Attendance: 15,302

30 December 2011 24	Southampton	0–1	Bristol City	St Mary's
19:45			Pearson 79'	Attendance: 30,328

3 January 2012 25	Bristol City	1–0	Millwall	Ashton Gate Stadium
19:45	Maynard 90+3'			Attendance: 12,410

14 January 2012 25	Brighton & Hove Albion	2–0	Bristol City	AMEX Stadium
19:45	Iñigo Calderón 37'; Buckley 73'			Attendance: 20,398

21 January 2012 26	Bristol City	2–1	Doncaster Rovers	Ashton Gate Stadium
15:00	Wood 26'; Cissé 31'		El-Hadji Diouf 75'	Attendance: 14,951

28 January 2012 27	Reading	1–0	Bristol City	Madejski Stadium
15:00	Roberts 58'			Attendance: 17,825

4 February 2012 29	Bristol City	0–3	Leeds United	Ashton Gate Stadium
19:45			Snodgrass 40'; McCormack 79'; Becchio 90'	Attendance: 15,257; Referee: Linington

11 February 2012 30	Hull City	3–0	Bristol City	KC Stadium
15:00	Hobbs 13'; Koren 15'; Fryatt 60'			Attendance: 17,435

14 February 2012 31	Bristol City	2–2	Crystal Palace	Ashton Gate Stadium
19:45	Pitman 77', 90'		Zaha 14'; Ambrose 69' (pen.)	Attendance: 12,470

18 February 2012 32	Peterborough United	3–0	Bristol City	London Road Stadium
15:00	Tomlin 7', 84'; Ball 62'			Attendance: 7,004; Referee: Phillips

25 February 2012 33	Bristol City	1–3	Blackpool	Ashton Gate Stadium
15:00	Stead 29'		Ince 55', 84'; K Phillips 87'	Attendance: 13,192; Referee: Kettle

3 March 2012 34	Ipswich Town	3–0	Bristol City	Portman Road
15:00	Chopra 25'; Smith 66'; Drury 85'			Attendance: 16,671; Referee: Woolmer

7 March 2012 35	Bristol City	3–2	Leicester City	Ashton Gate Stadium
19:45	Cissé 45'; Pitman 54'; Stead 79'		Dyer 41'; Danns 77'	Attendance: 12,033; Referee: Haywood

10 March 2012 36	Bristol City	1–2	Cardiff City	Ashton Gate Stadium
17:20	Stead 52'		McManus 45' (o.g.); Cissé (og.) 87' (o.g.)	Attendance: 12,495; Referee: Oliver

17 March 2012 37	Portsmouth	0–0	Bristol City	Fratton Park
15:00				Attendance: 16,695; Referee: D'Urso

20 March 2012 38	Bristol City	0–2	Watford	Ashton Gate Stadium
19:45			James 15' (o.g.); Murray 20'	Attendance: 12,017; Referee: Langford

24 March 2012 39	Middlesbrough	1–1	Bristol City	Riverside Stadium
15:00	Martin 56'		Ephraim 13'	Attendance: 15,275; Referee: Webster

31 March 2012 40	Bristol City	1–1	Derby County	Ashton Gate Stadium
15:00	Pitman 74'		Bryson 20'	Attendance: 12,794; Referee: Ward

7 April 2012 41	Nottingham Forest	0–1	Bristol City	City Ground
17:20			Wood 55' (pen.)	Attendance: 22,851; Referee: Waugh

9 April 2012 42	Bristol City	3–1	Coventry City	Ashton Gate Stadium
15:00	Stead 47'; Bolasie 82'; Pitman (red card) 87'; Wood 90'		Stead 33' (og)	Attendance: 19,003; Referee: Mathieson

14 April 2012 43	Birmingham City	2–2	Bristol City	St Andrew's
15:00	King 44'; Žigić 61'		Pearson 21'; Stead 33'	Attendance: 23,230

17 April 2012 44	Bristol City	1–1	West Ham	Ashton Gate Stadium
19:45	Skuse 29'		Tomkins 25'	Attendance: 16,669

21 April 2012 45	Bristol City	2–0	Barnsley	Ashton Gate Stadium
15:00	Skuse 11'; Stead 51' (pen.)			Attendance: 18,562

28 April 2012 46	Burnley	1–1	Bristol City	Turf Moor
15:00	Ings 76'		Taylor 81'	Attendance: 13,369

=== FA Cup ===
Bristol City's FA Cup third round tie was drawn away to Crawley Town as Ball Number 5 (City) and Ball Number 51 (Crawley) respectively, the tie was played on 7 January 2012, with a kick-off time at 15:00. City lost by a single goal to Crawley from a Matt Tubbs goal.

7 January 2012 Third Round	Crawley Town	1–0	Bristol City	Broadfield Stadium
15:00	Tubbs 74'			Attendance: 3,779; Referee: Andy D'Urso

=== League Cup ===
Bristol City's League Cup round 1 tie against Swindon, drawn to be played on 9 August 2011, was postponed on police advice. This was due to fears of safety issues following rioting in London. The game was set to a new date 24 August 2011. City lost by a single goal to Swindon from a De Vita goal.

24 August 2011 Round 1	Bristol City	0–1	Swindon Town	Ashton Gate
19:45			De Vita 71'	Attendance: 7,708; Referee: Ward

== Transfers ==
=== In ===
No.	Pos.	Nat.	Name	Age	EU	Moving from	Type	Transfer window	Ends	Transfer fee	Source
17	MF	(Democratic Republic of the Congo) (France)	Bolasie	22	EU	Plymouth Argyle	Transfer	Summer	2013	£50,000^{1}	
12	FW	(England)	Taylor	23	EU	Rotherham United	Free Transfer	Summer	2014	Tribunal	
8	MF	(Australia) (England)	Kilkenny	25	EU	Leeds United	Free Transfer	Summer	2014	Free	
37	MF	(Scotland)	Pearson	29	EU	Derby County	Transfer	Winter	2012	Free	
26	DF	(Scotland)	Foster	26	EU	Aberdeen (Scotland)	Transfer	Winter	2014	£250,000^{2}	

Notes
^{1}Although officially undisclosed Bristol Evening Post believed the deal to be around £50,000.

^{2}Although officially undisclosed Soccerbase listed the deal as be worth £250,000.

=== Loans in ===
No.	Pos.	Name	Country	Age	Loan club	Started	Ended	Start source	End source
2	DF	Spence	(England)	21	West Ham United	3 August	24 April		
36	DF	McGivern	(Northern Ireland)	36	Manchester City	31 August	30 May		
37	MF	Pearson	(Scotland)	29	Derby County	4 November	6 January		
39	FW	Wood	(New Zealand)	34	West Bromwich Albion	12 January	30 May		
28	DF	McManus	(Scotland)	29	Middlesbrough	14 February	28 March		
10	MF	Davis	(England)	32	Bolton Wanderers	24 February	24 March		
33	DF	Amougou	(Cameroon)	27	Burnley	22 March	24 April		
10	MF	Ephraim	(England)	24	Queens Park Rangers	22 March	30 May		
38	DF	Keinan	(Israel)	27	Cardiff City	22 March	30 May		

Sources: For loan start source see "Start source". For loan end source see "End source".
EU = if holds or not a European Union passport; Country: when 2 flags, 1st flag = country that plays for internationally, 2nd flag = country of birth; No. = number on jersey; P = Position (for position name, pause mouse pointer on abbreviation); Name = Name on jersey (for more extensive name, pause mouse pointer on name); In/Out = In: The player came in on loan, Out: The player went out on loan; Loan club = the club that the player moved on loan to or the club that the player came from on loan; Started = the date when the player's loan started; Ended = the date when the player's loan ended.

=== Out ===
No.	Pos.	Name	Country	Age	Type	Moving to	Transfer window	Transfer fee	Apps	Goals	Source
17	MF	Sproule	(Northern Ireland)	30	Free Transfer	Hibernian (Scotland)	Summer	Free	130	7	
16	FW	Akinde	(England)	21	Transfer	Crawley Town	Summer	Undisclosed	21	1	
13	GK	Henderson	(Republic of Ireland)	23	Free Transfer	Portsmouth	Summer	Free	2	0	
	MF	Keohane	(Republic of Ireland)	20	Free Transfer	Exeter City	Summer	Free	0	0	
16	MF	Lennox	(England)	unknown	Released		Winter	Free	0	0	
10	FW	Maynard	(England)	25	Transfer	West Ham United	Winter	Undisclosed	124	45	
28	DF	Hunt	(England)	28	Free Transfer	Preston North End	Winter	Free	8	0	

EU = if holds or not a European Union passport; Country: when 2 flags, 1st flag = country that plays for internationally, 2nd flag = country of birth; N = number on jersey; P = Position (for position name, pause mouse pointer on abbreviation); Name = Name on jersey (for more extensive name, pause mouse pointer on name); Age = age on the day of the signing; Moving from = only indicate the club the player was playing before start playing for this club in this season, for the type of the moving see Status column; Moving to = only indicates the club the player is going to play next, for the type of the moving see Status column; Ends = when the player's current contract ends; n/a = Not applicable; Apps = Total number of competitive appearances (including substitute appearances) at the club prior to departure; Goals = Total number of competitive goals scored at the club prior to departure.

=== Loans out ===
No.	Pos.	Name	Country	Age	Loan club	Started	Ended	Start source	End source
33	MF	Johnson	(England)	30	Chesterfield	26 August	3 January		
24	FW	Jackson	(England)	20	Northampton Town	13 September	19 November		
16	FW	Clarkson	(Scotland)	26	Brentford	15 September	15 October		
23	DF	Edwards	(England)	21	Stockport County	28 September	3 January		
19	DF	Ribeiro	(Wales)	22	Carlisle United	2 November	3 January		
24	FW	Jackson	(England)	21	Cheltenham Town	24 November	3 January		
26	MF	Reid	(England)	18	Cheltenham Town	24 November	3 January		
24	FW	Jackson	(England)	35	Telford United	5 January			
35	DF	Stewart	(Jamaica)	45	Notts County	5 January			
19	DF	Ribeiro	(Wales)	22	Scunthorpe United	11 January	22 March		
23	DF	Edwards	(England)	35	Yeovil Town	12 January			
3	DF	McAllister	(Scotland)	33	Preston North End	20 January	22 February		
20	MF	Campbell-Ryce	(Jamaica)	29	Leyton Orient	8 March	31 May		

Sources: For loan start source see "Start source". For loan end source see "End source".
EU = if holds or not a European Union passport; Country: when 2 flags, 1st flag = country that plays for internationally, 2nd flag = country of birth; No. = number on jersey; P = Position (for position name, pause mouse pointer on abbreviation); Name = Name on jersey (for more extensive name, pause mouse pointer on name); In/Out = In: The player came in on loan, Out: The player went out on loan; Loan club = the club that the player moved on loan to or the club that the player came from on loan; Started = the date when the player's loan started; Ended = the date when the player's loan ended.

== Overall summary ==
=== Summary ===
Games played	48 (46 Championship, 1 FA Cup, 1 League Cup)
Games won	12 (12 Championship, 0 FA Cup, 0 League Cup)
Games drawn	13 (13 Championship, 0 FA Cup, 0 League Cup)
Games lost	23 (21 Championship, 1 FA Cup, 1 League Cup)
Goals scored	44 (44 Championship, 0 FA Cup, 0 League Cup)
Goals conceded	70 (68 Championship, 1 FA Cup, 1 League Cup)
Goal difference	−26
Clean sheets	8 (8 Championship, 0 FA Cup, 0 League Cup)
Yellow cards	76 (74 Championship, 1 FA Cup, 1 League Cup)
Red cards	7 (6 Championship, 1 FA Cup, 0 League Cup)
Worst discipline	Stephen Pearson (5 (yellow card) , 1 (red card) )
Best result	3–1 vs. Burnley, 5 November 2011
Worst result	0–5 vs. Blackpool, 1 October 2011
Most appearances	Albert Adomah (46 appearances)
Top scorer	Jon Stead (9 goals)
Points	49
