= Joe Gormley (footballer) =

Northern Irish footballer

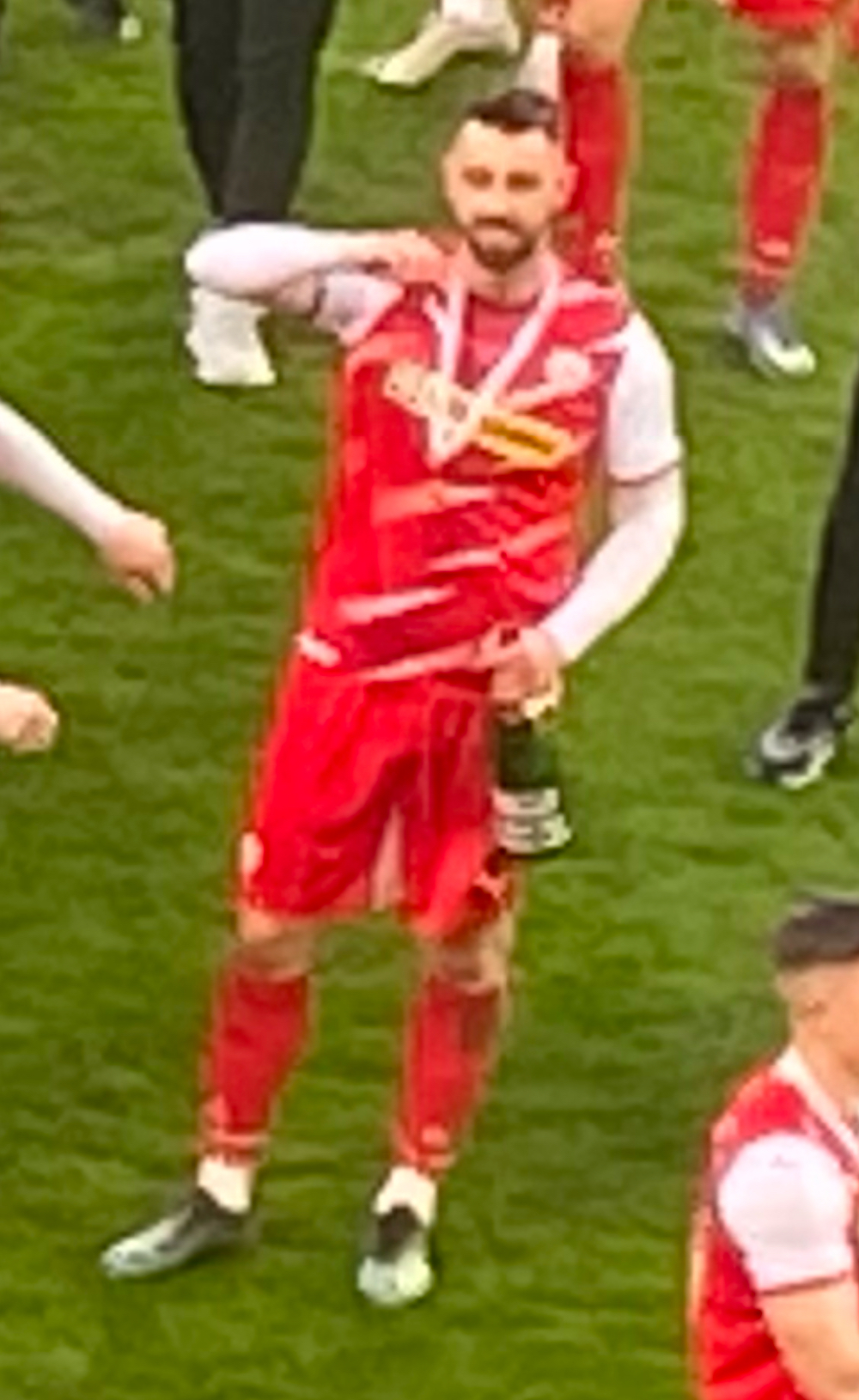
- Gormley in March 2022

Personal information
- Full name: Joseph Anthony Gormley
- Date of birth: 26 November 1989 (age 36)
- Place of birth: Belfast, Northern Ireland
- Position: Forward

Team information
- Current team: Cliftonville
- Number: 19

Senior career*
Years	Team	Apps	(Gls)
2007–2009	Cliftonville	4	(0)
2009–2011	Crumlin Star	24	(61)
2011–2015	Cliftonville	133	(85)
2015–2016	Peterborough United	5	(0)
2016	→ St Johnstone (loan)	1	(0)
2017–	Cliftonville	286	(130)
- * Club domestic league appearances and goals as of 29 April 2026

Joseph Anthony Gormley (born Belfast, 26 November 1989) is a footballer who plays as a striker for Cliftonville in the Irish League.

Gormley is Cliftonville's all-time record goalscorer, reaching 300 in November 2025.

== Club career ==
=== Early career ===
Gormley began his career at Cliftonville, making four appearances before being released in 2009. He joined Crumlin Star, where he scored 61 goals in the 2010–11 season before re-joining Cliftonville in 2011.

=== Cliftonville ===
Gormley was top goalscorer in Northern Ireland in 2013–14, when he became the first player in the club's history to score over 30 goals in two separate seasons, and was named as Ulster Footballer of the Year and Northern Ireland Football Writers' Player of the Year for 2013–14. He holds the club record for most goals scored in a domestic season, claiming 41 in 2014–15 and breaking his own previous record of 37 goals the season before.

=== Peterborough United ===
On 14 June 2015, it was confirmed that Peterborough United had signed Gormley on a three-year deal, and he would officially join the club on 1 July 2015.

On 25 September 2015 he was sidelined for the rest of the season by a serious knee injury. Gormley was loaned to Scottish club St Johnstone in August 2016. After two months with St Johnstone, Gormley became "disillusioned with football" and decided to return to his native Northern Ireland. Gormley, Peterborough and St Johnstone applied to FIFA for permission to cancel his contracts outside the normal transfer windows.

== Career statistics ==
Gormley's 300 goals for Cliftonville have been scored as follows: 204 Irish League, 43 League Cup, 27 Irish Cup, 16 County Antrim Shield, 5 Europa League play-offs, 3 Europe, 2 Setanta Cup. He has scored 17 hat-tricks and 26 penalty kicks.

As of match played 11 April 2026

Club	Season	League			National Cup		League Cup		Europe		Other		Total	
Club	Season	Division	Apps	Goals	Apps	Goals	Apps	Goals	Apps	Goals	Apps	Goals	Apps	Goals
Cliftonville	2007–08	Irish Premier League	0	0					–				0	0
Cliftonville	2008–09	IFA Premiership	4	0					–				4	0
Cliftonville	Total		4	0	0	0	0	0	–		0	0	4	0
Crumlin Star	2009–10	Northern Amateur Football League					–		–				–	–
Crumlin Star	2010–11	Northern Amateur Football League					–		–					
Crumlin Star	Total						–		–				24	61
Cliftonville	2011–12	IFA Premiership	30	10	1	0	3	0	2 (Note: Appearances in UEFA Europa League)	0	3 (Note: Appearances in Setanta Sports Cup)	2	39	12
Cliftonville	2012–13	IFA Premiership	30	17	4	5	4	8	2	0	1	0	41	30
Cliftonville	2013–14	NIFL Premiership	36	27	2	2	5	8	2 (Note: Appearances in UEFA Champions League)	0	2 (Note: Appearances in County Antrim Shield)	0	47	37
Cliftonville	2014–15	NIFL Premiership	37	31	2	2	4	7	1	0	4 (Note: 1 appearance in the NIFL Charity Shield & 3 appearances in County Antrim Shield)	1	48	41
Cliftonville	Total		133	85	9	9	16	23	7	0	10	3	175	120
Peterborough United	2015–16	EFL League One	4	0	0	0	2	0	–		0 (Note: Appearances in EFL Trophy)	0	6	0
Peterborough United	2016–17	EFL League One	1	0	0	0	0	0	–		0	0	1	0
Peterborough United	Total		5	0	0	0	2	0	–		0	0	7	0
St Johnstone (loan)	2016–17	Scottish Premiership	1	0	0	0	1	0	–		–		2	0
Cliftonville	2017–18	NIFL Premiership	37	23	4	6	3	0	–		4 (Note: 2 appearances, 2 goals in the Europa League Playoffs & 2 appearances, 2 goals in County Antrim Shield)	4	46	35
Cliftonville	2018–19	NIFL Premiership	37	23	0	0	2	2	2	1	4 (Note: 2 appearances, 2 goals in the Europa League Playoffs & 2 appearances, 2 goals in County Antrim Shield)	4	45	30
Cliftonville	2019–20	NIFL Premiership	31	18	4	2	3	3	4	1	4	2	46	26
Cliftonville	2020–21	NIFL Premiership	13	2	0	0	–		–		5 (Note: 3 appearances, 5 goals in County Antrim Shield & 2 appearances in 2021 UEFA Europa Conference League play-offs)	5	18	7
Cliftonville	2021–22	NIFL Premiership	37	13	3	5	5	4	–		2	2	47	24
Cliftonville	2022–23	NIFL Premiership	38	10	3	2	4	4	2 (Note: Appearances in UEFA Europa Conference League)	0	5 (Note: 2 appearances, 1 goal in County Antrim Shield & 1 appearance in Scottish Challenge Cup & 2 appearances in 2023 UEFA Europa Conference League play-offs)	1	52	17
Cliftonville	2023–24	NIFL Premiership	33	11	4	1	2	0	–		0	0	39	12
Cliftonville	2024–25	NIFL Premiership	32	20	5	2	3	1	2 (Note: Appearances in UEFA Conference League)	0	1 (Note: Appearance in 2025 UEFA Europa Conference League play-offs)	0	43	23
Cliftonville	2025–26	NIFL Premiership	26	10	3	1	3	2	2	1	3	1	37	15
Cliftonville	Total		284	130	26	19	25	16	12	3	28	19	375	187
Career total			427	215	35	28	44	39	19	3	38	32	587	379

== Honours ==
Cliftonville

- NIFL Premiership (2): 2012–13, 2013–14
- Irish League Cup (5): 2012–13, 2013–14, 2014–15, 2021-22, 2024-25
- County Antrim Shield (3): 2011–12, 2014–15, 2019–20
- Irish Cup: 2023–24

Individual awards

- Ulster Footballer of the Year (1): 2013–14
- Northern Ireland Football Writers' Association Player of the Year (1): 2013–14
