= Newforge Lane =

Private members' club in Northern Ireland

- Full name: Newforge Lane
- Location: Belfast, Northern Ireland
- Owner: RUC Athletic Association
- Capacity: 478
- Surface: Grass

Construction
- Built: 1956
- Renovated: 2003 and 2010

Tenant
- PSNI

Newforge Lane is a private-members' country club for members of the RUC Athletic Association, located in Belfast, Northern Ireland. It hosts multiple sports facilities, principally the football stadium, which serves as the home ground of the Police Service of Northern Ireland Football Club. From 2003-11, Queen's University Football Club also used Newforge Lane as its home ground.

== Newforge Lane football ground ==
The club was opened in May 1956, and part of the grounds was laid out with a football field, which today is known by the name of the country club itself. Only one side of the ground is developed with two turnstiles at the entrance at the country club side. These lead to the David Whatton Stand, built in 2003 and providing seating for 112 spectators, a small disabled enclosure, toilet facilities and a small covered terrace opened in 2010. The club offices and dressing rooms are situated behind the stand and are accessed via a bowling green behind the ground.

The remaining three sides of the ground do not have any spectator facilities, although large lawned areas are situated behind both goals at the Newforge Lane end and Lagan End, allowing spectators to view games from behind both goals. The Lagan Meadows side of the ground contains only a narrow flagstone footpath but again spectators can view a game from here if they choose. The pitch itself is fully fenced off by a five-foot high barrier.

There are no refreshment facilities as the football ground itself but the country club is situated fifty metres away and contains a bar and restaurant.

PSNI, originally under the name RUC, have played at the venue since it was opened. In 2004 Queen's University were also granted permission to use the venue when their own ground was considered unsuitable for the newly created IFA Championship of which both clubs were founder members. Queen's moved back to Upper Malone in 2011.

The official capacity of the stadium is 478 but matches rarely attract attendances above a few dozen spectators.

The ground is also regularly used as a training base for the Northern Ireland national football team.
