= 2018–19 NIFL Premiership =

NIFL Premiership
- Season: 2018–19
- Dates: 4 August 2018 – 27 April 2019
- Champions: Linfield; 5th Premiership title 53rd Irish title
- Relegated: Newry City; Ards (via play-off)
- Champions League: Linfield
- Europa League: Crusaders (via Irish Cup); Ballymena United; Cliftonville (via play-offs)
- Matches: 228
- Goals: 696 (3.05 per match)
- Top goalscorer: Joe Gormley (20 goals)
- Biggest home win: Ballymena United 6–1 Institute (19 March 2019)
- Biggest away win: Warrenpoint Town 1–6 Ballymena United (1 September 2018); Warrenpoint Town 0–5 Linfield (7 September 2018); Warrenpoint Town 0–5 Glentoran (9 February 2019); Dungannon Swifts 0–5 Linfield (22 March 2019)
- Highest scoring: Institute 6–4 Cliftonville (22 December 2018)

The 2018–19 NIFL Premiership (known as the Danske Bank Premiership for sponsorship reasons) was the 11th season of the NIFL Premiership, the highest level of league football in Northern Ireland, the 118th season of Irish league football overall, and the 6th season of the league operating as part of the Northern Ireland Football League.

Linfield were champions, winning the league for the 53rd time.

== Summary ==
The season began on 4 August 2018 and concluded on 27 April 2019, with the play-offs for promotion/relegation and the Europa League then taking place in May 2019.

Crusaders were the defending champions from the previous season. However, they were unable to defend their title, finishing in fourth place. Linfield were the eventual champions, lifting the league title for the second time in three seasons, and stretching their record tally of title wins to 53 overall. The Blues were confirmed as the champions on 13 April 2019, following a 0–0 draw at home against the outgoing champions, Crusaders, which left Linfield 12 points clear at the top of the table, with only three games remaining and nine points left to play for.

For the second successive season, two clubs suffered relegation to the NIFL Championship. Newry City finished bottom of the table, and were relegated to the 2019–20 NIFL Championship after only one season in the top flight. Eleventh-placed Ards faced 2018–19 NIFL Championship runners-up, Carrick Rangers, in a two-legged promotion/relegation play-off. Carrick Rangers won the tie 3–1 on aggregate to secure promotion and relegate Ards. This brought an end to Ards' three-season stay in the top flight, and meant an immediate return to the Premiership for Carrick Rangers after only one season in the Championship.

Premiership champions Linfield entered the 2019–20 UEFA Champions League, with the runners-up (Ballymena United) and the play-off winners (Cliftonville) entering the 2019–20 UEFA Europa League along with the 2018–19 Irish Cup winners, Crusaders. Linfield also qualified to take part in the newly introduced Champions Cup against the 2019 League of Ireland Premier Division champions, Dundalk.

== Teams ==
Locations of the 2018–19 NIFL Premiership teams
Locations of the Belfast-based 2018–19 NIFL Premiership teams

Twelve teams competed in the 2018–19 NIFL Premiership, ten of which retained their Premiership status from the previous season. Ballinamallard United were relegated to the 2018–19 NIFL Championship after finishing bottom of the 2017–18 NIFL Premiership, and were replaced by Institute as winners of the 2017–18 NIFL Championship.

Carrick Rangers finished in the promotion-relegation play-off place, and lost their Premiership place after losing the play-off 6–3 on aggregate against Championship runners-up Newry City.

=== Stadia and locations ===
Club	Stadium	Location	Capacity^{‡}
Ards	Bangor Fuels Arena	Bangor	1,895 (500 seated)
Ballymena United	The Showgrounds	Ballymena	3,050 (2,280 seated)
Cliftonville	Solitude	Belfast	2,530 (all seated)
Coleraine	The Showgrounds	Coleraine	2,496 (1,106 seated)
Crusaders	Seaview	Belfast	3,383 (all seated)
Dungannon Swifts	Stangmore Park	Dungannon	5,000 (300 seated)
Glenavon	Mourneview Park	Lurgan	4,160 (4,000 seated)
Glentoran	The Oval	Belfast	6,054 (4,989 seated)
Institute	Brandywell Stadium	Derry	7,700 (2,900 seated)
Linfield	Windsor Park	Belfast	18,614 (all seated)
Newry City	The Showgrounds	Newry	2,275 (1,080 seated)
Warrenpoint Town	Milltown	Warrenpoint	1,280 (150 seated)

== League table ==
Pos	Team	Pld	W	D	L	GF	GA	GD	Pts	Qualification or relegation (Note: Teams play each other three times (33 matches), before the league split into two groups (the top six and the bottom six) for the last five matches.)
1	Linfield (C)	38	26	7	5	77	27	+50	85	Qualification for the Champions League first qualifying round
2	Ballymena United	38	24	6	8	83	47	+36	78	Qualification for the Europa League preliminary round
3	Glenavon	38	20	10	8	74	46	+28	70	Qualification for the Europa League play-offs (Note: Cliftonville qualified for the Europa League preliminary round as Europa League play-off winners.)
4	Crusaders	38	20	5	13	68	55	+13	65	Qualification for the Europa League first qualifying round (Note: Crusaders qualified for the Europa League first qualifying round as 2018–19 Irish Cup winners.)
5	Cliftonville (O)	38	19	4	15	70	66	+4	61	Qualification for the Europa League play-offs
6	Coleraine	38	15	11	12	59	55	+4	56	Qualification for the Europa League play-offs
7	Glentoran	38	13	10	15	58	53	+5	49	Qualification for the Europa League play-offs
8	Institute	38	13	5	20	50	72	−22	44	
9	Dungannon Swifts	38	11	9	18	44	65	−21	42	
10	Warrenpoint Town	38	10	9	19	51	79	−28	39	
11	Ards (R)	38	6	9	23	31	63	−32	27	Qualification for the relegation play-offs
12	Newry City (R)	38	6	5	27	31	68	−37	23	Relegation to the NIFL Championship

Source: NIFL Premiership, Soccerway
Rules for classification: 1) Points; 2) Goal difference; 3) Number of goals scored; 4) Head-to-head points; 5) Head-to-head goal difference; 6) Drawing of lots
(C) Champions; (O) Play-off winners; (R) Relegated

== Results ==
=== Matches 1–22 ===
During matches 1–22 each team played every other team twice (home and away).

Home \ Away	ARD	BYM	CLF	COL	CRU	DUN	GLA	GLT	INS	LIN	NEW	WPT
Ards	—	1–2	1–3	0–0	0–1	2–2	0–2	0–2	0–1	2–1	4–0	1–1
Ballymena United	2–0	—	2–1	3–3	3–0	1–1	2–1	2–1	6–1	2–1	3–0	1–2
Cliftonville	3–1	3–2	—	1–2	1–5	5–1	4–2	1–0	3–0	1–1	3–1	3–1
Coleraine	1–0	2–2	1–2	—	1–0	2–1	1–4	1–1	2–2	0–0	0–1	3–0
Crusaders	4–2	2–2	3–2	0–3	—	1–0	3–0	3–0	3–2	0–2	1–0	3–1
Dungannon Swifts	0–0	0–2	1–1	0–2	3–2	—	1–1	1–0	2–1	1–2	1–1	0–2
Glenavon	3–1	4–0	0–2	4–0	3–2	2–1	—	1–1	3–3	0–1	2–0	1–1
Glentoran	4–0	0–1	1–2	2–2	2–2	2–1	1–2	—	2–1	0–1	4–1	3–1
Institute	1–0	1–2	6–4	1–2	1–4	0–0	1–4	3–3	—	1–4	1–0	2–0
Linfield	0–0	2–1	4–2	1–2	4–1	3–0	0–0	4–0	3–0	—	3–1	1–1
Newry City	2–0	1–2	1–0	1–1	0–3	2–1	1–2	1–1	0–2	0–2	—	1–1
Warrenpoint Town	1–0	1–6	2–1	2–1	1–2	1–1	2–4	1–1	0–1	0–5	2–2	—

Source: NIFL Premiership
Legend: Blue = home team win; Yellow = draw; Red = away team win.
For upcoming matches, an "a" indicates there is an article about the rivalry between the two participants.

=== Matches 23–33 ===
During matches 23–33 each team played every other team for the third time (either at home, or away).

Home \ Away	ARD	BYM	CLF	COL	CRU	DUN	GLA	GLT	INS	LIN	NEW	WPT
Ards	—	—	—	1–2	2–2	—	—	—	0–3	0–2	3–1	0–1
Ballymena United	4–1	—	2–1	—	—	2–2	—	0–2	—	—	3–1	—
Cliftonville	4–1	—	—	—	—	—	1–1	2–1	1–0	0–2	1–0	—
Coleraine	—	0–4	4–1	—	—	1–2	1–1	2–0	—	—	—	—
Crusaders	—	3–2	2–0	4–2	—	—	1–1	—	—	0–1	—	—
Dungannon Swifts	0–3	—	3–1	—	1–0	—	—	—	—	0–5	2–1	4–3
Glenavon	2–0	0–2	—	—	—	1–0	—	—	3–3	2–0	—	1–3
Glentoran	1–1	—	—	—	0–1	2–4	1–2	—	—	—	2–1	—
Institute	—	1–2	—	1–0	1–3	2–0	—	0–2	—	—	—	—
Linfield	—	1–0	—	3–2	—	—	—	4–2	2–0	—	—	4–0
Newry City	—	—	—	1–4	0–1	—	0–1	—	1–2	0–1	—	0–2
Warrenpoint Town	—	2–4	0–2	0–1	1–3	—	—	0–5	4–0	—	—	—

Source: NIFL Premiership
Legend: Blue = home team win; Yellow = draw; Red = away team win.
For upcoming matches, an "a" indicates there is an article about the rivalry between the two participants.

=== Matches 34–38 ===
During matches 34–38 each team will play every other team in their half of the table once. As this is the fourth time that teams play each other this season, home sides are chosen so that they will have played each other twice at home and twice away.

==== Section A ====
Home \ Away	BYM	CLF	COL	CRU	GLA	LIN
Ballymena United	—	—	1–0	3–0	4–3	0–1
Cliftonville	1–1	—	4–2	2–0	—	—
Coleraine	—	—	—	4–2	—	1–1
Crusaders	—	—	—	—	—	—
Glenavon	—	4–0	1–1	2–1	—	—
Linfield	—	5–1	—	0–0	0–4	—

Source: NIFL Premiership
Legend: Blue = home team win; Yellow = draw; Red = away team win.
1. Original 0–3 result overturned to 3–0 by NIFL, after Crusaders fielded a player not listed on the official teamsheet.

==== Section B ====
Home \ Away	ARD	DUN	GLT	INS	NEW	WPT
Ards	—	1–0	1–1	—	—	—
Dungannon Swifts	—	—	1–2	2–1	—	—
Glentoran	—	—	—	2–0	—	2–2
Institute	0–1	—	—	—	2–1	2–1
Newry City	3–0	0–1	0–2	—	—	—
Warrenpoint Town	1–1	5–3	—	—	2–4	—

Source: NIFL Premiership
Legend: Blue = home team win; Yellow = draw; Red = away team win.

== Play-offs ==
=== UEFA Europa League play-offs ===
Four of the teams (Crusaders qualified for the Europa League directly as 2018–19 Irish Cup winners) that finished in the play-off places (3rd–7th position) participated in the Europa League play-offs to decide which team would qualify for the 2019–20 UEFA Europa League preliminary round. After victories over Coleraine and Glenavon in the semi-finals respectively, Cliftonville and Glentoran once again contested the final, with Cliftonville securing the last remaining place in next season's Europa League after a 2–0 win. This was a repeat of the 2016 and 2018 play-off finals, with Cliftonville winning 3–2 on both previous occasions.

==== Semi-finals ====
7 May 2019
19:45 BST
Semi-final

Glenavon (3rd)	2 – 4	Glentoran (7th)
Marron 45'; Mitchell 54'	BBC Sport; NIFL	Murray 27', 76'; Allen 48'; McDaid 55'

Mourneview Park, Lurgan
Referee: Lee Tavinder

7 May 2019
19:45 BST
Semi-final

Cliftonville (5th)	5 – 3 (a.e.t.)	Coleraine (6th)
Gormley 34'; McMenamin 76', 113'; Curran 90+7' (pen.); Ives 92'	BBC Sport; NIFL	McLaughlin 9', 28', 72'

Solitude, Belfast
Referee: Steven Gregg

==== Final ====
11 May 2019
17:30 BST
Final

Cliftonville (5th)	2 – 0 (a.e.t.)	Glentoran (7th)
Gormley 105+1'; McMenamin 119'	BBC Sport; NIFL

Solitude, Belfast
Referee: Andrew Davey

Cliftonville won the Europa League play-offs, and qualified for the 2019–20 UEFA Europa League preliminary round.

=== NIFL Premiership play-offs ===
==== Pre play-off ====
The 2018–19 NIFL Championship runners-up, Carrick Rangers, took part in a Championship promotion pre play-off match against the 3rd-placed team, Portadown, with Carrick Rangers given home advantage as the higher-ranked of the two clubs. Carrick Rangers won the match 2–0 and advanced to the two-legged play-off against the 11th-placed NIFL Premiership team, Ards, for the last remaining place in the 2019–20 NIFL Premiership. The pre play-off match was played on 30 April 2019.

30 April 2019
19:45 BST
Pre play-off

Carrick Rangers (Ch. 2nd)	2 – 0	Portadown (Ch. 3rd)
McCallum 74' (o.g.); Nixon 90+2'	BBC Sport; NIFL

Loughshore Hotel Arena, Carrickfergus
Referee: Declan Hassan

==== Play-off ====
The 11th-placed Premiership team, Ards, played a two-legged tie against the pre play-off winners, Carrick Rangers, with Ards given the advantage of playing the second leg at home as the Premiership club. Carrick Rangers won the tie 3–1 on aggregate to secure promotion to the 2019–20 NIFL Premiership, with Ards being relegated to the Championship. The matches took place on 3 May and 6 May 2019.

3 May 2019
19:45 BST
First leg

Carrick Rangers (Ch. 2nd)	1 – 0	Ards (Pr. 11th)
Smith 11'	BBC Sport; NIFL

Loughshore Hotel Arena, Carrickfergus
Referee: Tony Clarke

6 May 2019
19:45 BST
Second leg

Ards (Pr. 11th)	1 – 2	Carrick Rangers (Ch. 2nd)
Taylor 37'	BBC Sport; NIFL	Surgenor 4'; Strain 29'

Bangor Fuels Arena, Bangor
Referee: Evan Boyce

Carrick Rangers won 3–1 on aggregate, and were promoted to the 2019–20 NIFL Premiership. Ards were relegated to the 2019–20 NIFL Championship.

== Top goalscorers ==
Rank	Scorer	Club	Goals
1	(Northern Ireland) Joe Gormley	Cliftonville	20
2	(Northern Ireland) Michael McCrudden	Institute	19
3	(Northern Ireland) Andrew Waterworth	Linfield	17
4	(Northern Ireland) Cathair Friel	Ballymena United	16
5	(Northern Ireland) Stephen Murray	Glenavon	15
6	(Northern Ireland) Paul Heatley	Crusaders	14
7	(Northern Ireland) Ryan Curran	Cliftonville	13
7	(Northern Ireland) Robbie McDaid	Glentoran	13
9	(Northern Ireland) Rory Donnelly	Cliftonville	12
9	(Northern Ireland) Paul McElroy	Dungannon Swifts	12
9	(Northern Ireland) Andrew Mitchell	Glenavon	12

== Attendances ==
#	Club	Average
1	Linfield	2,390
2	Glentoran	1,585
3	Coleraine	1,497
4	Ballymena	1,397
5	Crusaders	1,394
6	Cliftonville	1,234
7	Glenavon	1,200
8	Newry City	630
9	Dungannon	626
10	Ards	566
11	Institute	418
12	Warrenpoint	260
