= 2019–20 NIFL Premiership =

118th edition of Northern Ireland's football league

NIFL Premiership
- Season: 2019–20
- Dates: 9 August 2019 – 7 March 2020
- Champions: Linfield; 6th Premiership title 54th Irish title
- Relegated: Institute
- UEFA Champions League: Linfield
- UEFA Europa League: Glentoran (via Irish Cup); Coleraine
- Matches: 186
- Goals: 566 (3.04 per match)
- Top goalscorer: Joe Gormley (18 goals)
- Biggest home win: Linfield 7–0 Glenavon (28 September 2019); Linfield 7–0 Warrenpoint Town (22 October 2019); Linfield 8–1 Glenavon (25 January 2020)
- Biggest away win: Institute 0–6 Crusaders (7 September 2019)
- Highest scoring: Linfield 8–1 Glenavon (25 January 2020)
- Highest attendance: 6,000; Glentoran 3–0 Linfield (26 December 2019)
- Lowest attendance: 58; Warrenpoint Town 1–3 Institute (28 September 2019)
- Total attendance: 221,733
- Average attendance: 1,192

The 2019–20 NIFL Premiership (known as the Danske Bank Premiership for sponsorship reasons) was the 12th season of the NIFL Premiership, the highest level of league football in Northern Ireland, the 119th season of Irish league football overall, and the 7th season of the league operating as part of the Northern Ireland Football League.

Linfield were champions, winning the league for the 54th time and the 2nd consecutive season. The season was curtailed after round 31 of the scheduled 38 rounds of matches, due to the COVID-19 pandemic in Northern Ireland.

== Summary ==
The fixtures were released on 26 June 2019. The season began on 9 August 2019 and was initially scheduled to conclude on 25 April 2020, with the promotion/relegation play-off scheduled to take place in the first week of May 2020. However, the season was suspended on 13 March 2020 as a result of the COVID-19 pandemic in Northern Ireland, with the clubs having only played 31 of the 38 rounds of fixtures. The season did not resume after the suspension, with the final games having been played on 7 March 2020.

The Irish FA initially suspended all football-related activity in Northern Ireland until 4 April, with this suspension subsequently being extended first until 30 April, and then until 31 May. On 9 June, NIFL gave clubs the opportunity to vote on two options to conclude the remainder of the season, both of which were rejected by a majority of clubs. The first option was playing two more rounds of fixtures behind closed doors and curtailing the league season after 33 games. This would have meant that every club had played every other club three times. The second option was to curtail the season immediately, and use a mathematical formula chosen by an independent panel to calculate the final standings. On 23 June 2020, after talks between the clubs had failed to find a consensus on an alternative option, NIFL announced that the season was over, and that a mathematical formula would be used to determine the final league standings.

Linfield were the defending champions, having lifted the league title for a record 53rd time the previous season. They successfully defended the title to win a record 54th league championship, after NIFL announced that the final league standings would be decided by a points per game average. Every team had played 31 games, so the application of points per game was academic, and there were no changes to the standings. This meant that Linfield equalled the world record for the most league titles won by any club, a record now shared with Scottish club Rangers. The promotion/relegation play-off was cancelled, meaning 11th-placed Warrenpoint Town were reprieved. However, automatic relegation still took place, meaning Institute faced the drop back into the NIFL Championship. On 29 June 2020, the club lodged an appeal with the Irish FA against their relegation. However, the appeal was rejected by the IFA, and the club decided not to pursue the matter any further.

Linfield qualified for the 2020–21 UEFA Champions League preliminary round, while runners-up Coleraine and 2019–20 Irish Cup winners Glentoran qualified for the 2020–21 UEFA Europa League preliminary round.

== Teams ==
Locations of the 2019–20 NIFL Premiership teams
Locations of the Belfast-based 2019–20 NIFL Premiership teams

Twelve teams competed in the 2019–20 NIFL Premiership, ten of which had retained their Premiership status from the previous season. The previous season's bottom Premiership club, Newry City, were relegated to the 2019–20 NIFL Championship after only one season in the top flight, and were replaced by Larne, who were promoted to the Premiership as 2018–19 NIFL Championship winners. This marked a return to the top flight for the first time in 11 years for Larne, after they were relegated at the end of the 2007–08 season when they did not apply for a place in the Premiership for the 2008–09 season.

The previous season's 11th-placed Premiership team, Ards, faced 2018–19 NIFL Championship runners-up, Carrick Rangers, in a two-legged promotion/relegation play-off. Carrick Rangers won the tie 3–1 on aggregate to secure promotion to this season's Premiership, with Ards relegated to replace them in the Championship. This brought an end to Ards' three-season stay in the top flight, and meant an immediate return to the Premiership for Carrick Rangers after only one season in the Championship.

=== Stadia and locations ===
Club	Stadium	Location	Capacity^{‡}
Ballymena United	The Showgrounds	Ballymena	3,050 (2,280 seated)
Carrick Rangers	Loughshore Hotel Arena	Carrickfergus	4,500 (250 seated)
Cliftonville	Solitude	Belfast	2,530 (all seated)
Coleraine	The Showgrounds	Coleraine	2,496 (1,106 seated)
Crusaders	Seaview	Belfast	3,383 (all seated)
Dungannon Swifts	Stangmore Park	Dungannon	5,000 (300 seated)
Glenavon	Mourneview Park	Lurgan	4,160 (4,000 seated)
Glentoran	The Oval	Belfast	6,054 (4,989 seated)
Institute	Brandywell Stadium	Derry	7,700 (2,900 seated)
Larne	Inver Park	Larne	2,000 (1,250 seated)
Linfield	Windsor Park	Belfast	18,614 (all seated)
Warrenpoint Town	Milltown	Warrenpoint	1,280 (150 seated)

== League table ==
Pos	Team	Pld	W	D	L	GF	GA	GD	Pts	PPG	Qualification or relegation (Note: The season was curtailed after 31 fixtures due to the COVID-19 pandemic in Northern Ireland. Standings were decided by a points per game average.)
1	Linfield (C)	31	22	3	6	71	24	+47	69	2.23	Qualification for the Champions League preliminary round
2	Coleraine	31	19	8	4	64	24	+40	65	2.10	Qualification for the Europa League preliminary round
3	Crusaders	31	17	8	6	66	30	+36	59	1.90	
4	Cliftonville	31	18	5	8	48	22	+26	59	1.90	
5	Glentoran	31	17	7	7	60	33	+27	58	1.87	Qualification for the Europa League preliminary round (Note: Glentoran qualified for the Europa League preliminary round by winning the 2019–20 Irish Cup.)
6	Larne	31	16	8	7	59	29	+30	56	1.81	
7	Glenavon	31	10	5	16	46	71	−25	35	1.13	
8	Carrick Rangers	31	10	2	19	34	47	−13	32	1.03	
9	Dungannon Swifts	31	8	6	17	36	76	−40	30	0.97	
10	Ballymena United	31	7	6	18	34	54	−20	27	0.87	
11	Warrenpoint Town (Note: The promotion/relegation play-off was cancelled due to the COVID-19 pandemic in Northern Ireland. Warrenpoint Town were reprieved from relegation.)	31	5	3	23	26	85	−59	18	0.58	
12	Institute (R)	31	2	9	20	23	72	−49	15	0.48	Relegation to the NIFL Championship

Source: NIFL Premiership
Rules for classification: 1) Points per game; 2) Goal difference; 3) Number of goals scored; 4) Head-to-head points; 5) Head-to-head goal difference; 6) Drawing of lots
(C) Champions; (R) Relegated

== Results ==
=== Matches 1–22 ===
During matches 1–22 each team will play every other team twice (home and away).

Home \ Away	BYM	CRK	CLF	COL	CRU	DUN	GLA	GLT	INS	LAR	LIN	WPT
Ballymena United	—	1–2	2–1	1–1	1–1	3–2	2–1	1–2	1–1	0–3	1–2	4–0
Carrick Rangers	0–1	—	0–1	1–4	1–3	1–0	6–2	0–1	3–0	1–2	0–3	1–0
Cliftonville	1–0	3–1	—	1–0	0–2	5–0	3–1	0–2	1–0	1–0	0–1	4–0
Coleraine	2–0	3–2	1–1	—	4–2	5–0	4–0	2–2	0–0	0–0	1–0	3–0
Crusaders	0–1	3–0	1–2	0–2	—	3–0	3–2	5–2	1–1	2–2	1–0	4–0
Dungannon Swifts	2–2	2–1	0–4	0–2	1–6	—	2–1	3–1	2–2	0–1	1–4	3–1
Glenavon	3–1	1–0	1–2	0–4	2–2	5–0	—	1–1	3–1	1–3	1–0	2–0
Glentoran	3–1	3–1	0–1	2–2	1–1	6–1	4–0	—	4–0	2–1	3–0	2–1
Institute	1–1	0–2	0–3	2–0	0–6	2–3	1–4	1–1	—	1–4	0–3	0–1
Larne	2–4	0–0	1–1	2–2	0–0	0–0	6–0	2–3	1–1	—	3–1	6–0
Linfield	2–1	2–0	1–0	2–4	1–1	0–0	7–0	1–0	3–1	1–0	—	7–0
Warrenpoint Town	2–1	0–3	1–5	3–1	0–1	4–3	1–3	0–4	1–3	0–2	0–2	—

Source: NIFL Premiership
Legend: Blue = home team win; Yellow = draw; Red = away team win.
For upcoming matches, an "a" indicates there is an article about the rivalry between the two participants.

=== Matches 23–31 ===
During matches 23–33 each team was scheduled to play every other team for the third time (either at home, or away). However, two rounds of fixtures did not take place, after the league season was curtailed as a result of the COVID-19 pandemic.

Home \ Away	BYM	CRK	CLF	COL	CRU	DUN	GLA	GLT	INS	LAR	LIN	WPT
Ballymena United	—	0–2	—	0–2	—	—	0–3	—	—	2–3	1–4	—
Carrick Rangers	—	—	1–0	0–2	—	1–2	—	—	—	—	0–2	1–2
Cliftonville	1–1	—	—	—	—	1–1	1–0	—	—	—	1–2	—
Coleraine	—	—	1–0	—	0–1	—	2–1	—	—	—	1–1	—
Crusaders	2–0	—	0–0	—	—	5–0	—	—	2–1	3–0	—	—
Dungannon Swifts	1–0	—	—	—	—	—	—	0–2	2–0	0–2	—	4–4
Glenavon	—	—	—	—	2–1	—	—	2–2	2–2	—	—	1–1
Glentoran	2–0	0–0	0–2	0–1	—	—	—	—	—	—	—	2–1
Institute	—	0–3	—	0–4	—	—	—	0–2	—	0–4	—	—
Larne	—	4–0	1–2	—	—	—	1–0	2–1	—	—	—	1–0
Linfield	—	—	—	—	4–0	2–1	8–1	—	3–0	—	—	—
Warrenpoint Town	—	—	—	0–4	0–4	—	—	—	2–2	—	1–2	—

Source: NIFL Premiership
Legend: Blue = home team win; Yellow = draw; Red = away team win.
For upcoming matches, an "a" indicates there is an article about the rivalry between the two participants.

== NIFL Premiership play-off ==
The eleventh-placed Premiership team usually played the Championship runners-up over two legs for one spot in the following season's NIFL Premiership, with the Premiership team given home advantage for the second leg. However, the play-off was cancelled when the league was curtailed due to the COVID-19 pandemic.

== Top goalscorers ==
Rank	Scorer	Club	Goals
1	(Northern Ireland) Joe Gormley	Cliftonville	18
2	(Northern Ireland) Robbie McDaid	Glentoran	15
3	(Northern Ireland) Andrew Waterworth	Linfield	13
4	(Northern Ireland) David McDaid	Larne	12
4	(Northern Ireland) Jamie McGonigle	Crusaders	12
4	(Croatia) Hrvoje Plum	Glentoran	12
7	(Northern Ireland) Joel Cooper	Linfield	11
7	(Northern Ireland) Conor McMenamin	Cliftonville	11
7	(Northern Ireland) Jonathan McMurray	Larne	11
7	(Northern Ireland) Jordan Owens	Crusaders	11
