= Newry City A.F.C. =

Association football club in Northern Ireland

Newry City
- Full name: Newry City Athletic Football Club
- Nickname: City
- Founded: 1918 (as Newry Town); 2013 (as Newry City AFC)
- Ground: The Showgrounds, Newry
- Capacity: 2,275
- Manager: Stuart King
- League: NIFL Championship
- 2025–26: NIFL Premier Intermediate League, 4th of 14 (promoted)
| Home colours | Away colours | Third colours |

Newry City Athletic Football Club, referred to as Newry City, are a semi-professional Northern Irish football club competing in the NIFL Championship, having been promoted from the NIFL Premier Intermediate League in May 2026. They also compete in the Irish Cup. The club is based in Newry, County Down and plays at the Showgrounds on the south eastern outskirts of the city. Newry City are a part of the Mid-Ulster Football Association. The club's colours are blue and white, with the jersey ordinarily employing blue and white vertical stripes.

== Background ==
Newry City A.F.C. is regarded as a phoenix club. The club it replaced was originally formed as Newry Town F.C in 1918, was renamed Newry City F.C. when Newry was awarded city status, and was dissolved in its previous iteration in September 2012, when a winding-up petition brought against the club by former player and manager Gerry Flynn was granted, and the club decided not to appeal the decision. This led to the majority of Newry City's players leaving for nearby rivals, Warrenpoint Town.

The new club was formed a year later by supporters of the defunct club, with its deliberately similar name, wearing the same colours and having the same home as its predecessor; as such, it is regarded as a phoenix club for Newry City F.C., but doesn't claim any legal connection to the former club business, and did not inherit its history or honours.

== History ==
=== Foundation ===
After the winding-up of Newry City F.C., discussions to form a new club began in December 2012. In February 2013, it was clarified that Newry City A.F.C. would be a new club and would not be liable for any debt owed by Newry City F.C. There were discussions for the club to join the Republic of Ireland's League of Ireland, however the Irish Football Association said that they would block any attempt for Newry City to join the League of Ireland. Newry City A.F.C. uses the old club's stadium, the Showgrounds, which is owned by Newry City F.C.'s season-ticket holders. This meant that it was not sold when Newry City F.C. was wound up.

Despite initial plans for the club to be named "Newry City 2012", Newry City A.F.C. was officially launched by former Newry Town player Ollie Ralph on 7 March 2013, and it was announced that they would seek to join the Irish Football Association, and play in the Intermediate B division of the Mid-Ulster Football League in the 2013–14 season. Northern Ireland manager Michael O'Neill was originally scheduled to take part in the club's launch, but was unable to attend.

=== Junior football from 2013 ===
In July 2013, the club was accepted as a member of the Mid-Ulster Football League Intermediate B division for the 2013–14 season - the fifth tier of football in Northern Ireland. They won the division in their first season, gaining immediate promotion to Intermediate A (the fourth tier), which in turn they won in 2015–16 after two seasons, earning promotion to the NIFL Premier Intermediate League (the third tier). In their first season in their division, the club were runners up, qualifying for the NIFL Championship Play-Off. Over two legs, the team beat Armagh City 7–2 on aggregate to earn promotion to the NIFL Championship for the 2017–18 season, a third promotion in four years, and confirming the return of senior league football to the city for the first time since 2011.

=== Senior football from 2017 ===
The club's rise was completed in the following season, as the runners-up spot in the 2017–18 Championship, and a 6–3 aggregate win over Carrick Rangers in the NIFL Premiership play-off saw the team reach the national top flight for the first time since its foundation, and top-tier football return to the city for the first time since 2011. Relegated to the NIFL Championship the following season (2018–19), the club remained in the Championship during the COVID affected seasons 2019–20, and 2020–21, eventually earning promotion back to the Premiership the following season by winning the Championship title. The 2021–22 NIFL Championship was the club's first senior title since its formation.

The 2022–23 season saw the club secure a tenth-place finish, avoiding relegation in their maiden season back in the Premiership.

=== Post Darren Mullen Era ===
In 2023, manager Darren Mullen stood down, having been in charge since the club's reformation in 2012, with Mullen's assistant Gary Boyle replacing him at the helm. The transition did not prove to be a successful one. With the club rooted to the foot of the NIFL Premiership table, Boyle resigned on 26 December 2023 following a 4–0 defeat to Glenavon.

On 2 January 2024, the club appointed former Warrenpoint Town and Cliftonville manager Barry Gray as Boyle's successor on a long-term contract.

In April 2024, the club's relegation was confirmed, following confirmation that Portadown had won the NIFL Championship, meaning Dundela, who were ineligible to be promoted, could not win the league.

== Rivalries ==
The club and its fans have a friendly rivalry/relationship with local neighbours Warrenpoint Town F.C., whose rise from the Mid Ulster league into senior football coincided with the demise of the original Newry City F.C., with 'the Point' inheriting much of the former clubs playing squad at the time. Separated by six miles, with Newry City's home ground, the Newry Showgrounds, on the southern outskirts of the city, situated on the route out of Newry toward Warrenpoint, matches between the two have been dubbed "the Mourne Ultimatum" and victory in such matches as "the Mourne Supremacy" (a pun referencing the Jason Bourne films).

== European record ==
The new club has never qualified for European competition. The predecessor club qualified once for the 1999 UEFA Intertoto Cup, where it reached the second round before succumbing to German side MSV Duisburg.

| Season | Competition | Round | Opponent | Home | Away | Aggregate |
|---|---|---|---|---|---|---|
| 1999 | UEFA Intertoto Cup | 1R | (Croatia) Hrvatski Dragovoljac | 2–0 | 0–1 | 2–1 |
| 1999 | UEFA Intertoto Cup | 2R | (Germany) Duisburg | 1–0 | 0–2 | 1–2 |

== Current squad ==
Note: Flags indicate national team as defined under FIFA eligibility rules; some limited exceptions apply. Players may hold more than one non-FIFA nationality.

| No. | Pos. | Nation | Player |
|---|---|---|---|
| 1 | GK | NIR | Jason Craughwell |
| 2 | DF | NIR | Darren King (Captain) |
| 3 | DF | NIR | Noel Healy |
| 4 | DF | NIR | Matthew Redina |
| 5 | DF | IRL | Gavin Smith |
| 6 | FW | NIR | Declan Carville |
| 7 | MF | NIR | Jack Chambers |
| 8 | MF | IRL | Alex O'Brien |
| 9 | FW | NIR | Lee Newell |
| 10 | FW | NIR | Thomas Lockhart |

| No. | Pos. | Nation | Player |
|---|---|---|---|
| 14 | DF | NIR | Jordan King |
| 17 | DF | NIR | Andrew Martin |
| 18 | DF | NIR | Stephen Moan |
| 20 | MF | NIR | Scott McCullough |
| 26 | MF | IRL | Georgie Poynton |
| 33 | MF | NIR | Donal Scullion |
| 34 | DF | IRL | Evan McEnteggart |
| 44 | DF | NIR | Jamie O'Flaherty |
| 52 | MF | NIR | Adam Dorans |

== Honours ==
Although Newry City A.F.C. were formed in 2013, and did not legally inherit the honours of the previous club, they are widely recognised as the spiritual successor to Newry City F.C. and their 2022-23 Mid Ulster Cup win has been recognised by the organisers as the club's 16th title, despite it being the first time the 'new' club have won the competition since its formation.

(Honours won as Newry City A.F.C in bold)

=== Senior honours ===
- **NIFL Championship: 1**
  - **2021–22**
- **Irish League First Division: 1**
  - 1997–98
- **County Antrim Shield: 1**
  - 1987–88
- **Mid-Ulster Cup: 16**
  - 1936–37, 1938–39, 1956–57, 1963–64, 1966–67, 1968–69, 1974–75, 1977–78, 1978–79, 1984–85, 1986–87, 1989–90, 1999–00, 2006–07, 2011–12, **2022–23**

=== Intermediate honours ===
- **Irish League B Division: 2**
  - 1959–60, 1980–81
- Mid Ulster Football League Intermediate A: 1
  - **2015–16**
- **Mid Ulster Football League Intermediate B**:1
  - **2013–14**
- **Irish Alliance League: 3**
  - 1954–55, 1955–56, 1956–57
- **Premier Cup**:1
  - **2015**
- **Irish Intermediate Cup: 4**
  - 1957–58, 1966–67, 1980–81, 2011–12
- **Bob Radcliffe Cup: 2**
  - 1978–79, 1984–85†
- **Raymond Cup: 1**
  - 1956–57+
- **Newell Cup: 1**
  - 1918–19

† Won by reserve team

+ Shared with Brantwood FC

== Women's team ==
The women's team played its first season in 2011. They won the Division 4 in 2011 and the Division 3 in 2012. They won the Division 1 title in 2013. The women's team was promoted to the Women's Premier League in 2014, after winning the Championship. In their 2015 Premier League season they only had 2 defeats and were second place going into the final matchday. After Linfield only drew with Glentoran United and Newry City won the team took first place and won the Premier League title.

They also reached the Irish Cup final in 2014 but lost on penalties.
