= Stephen Baxter (footballer) =

Northern Irish footballer and manager

Stephen Baxter BEM
Personal information
- Date of birth: 1 October 1965 (age 61)
- Place of birth: Belfast, Northern Ireland
- Position: Striker

Team information
- Current team: Carrick Rangers (manager)

Youth career
- Glentoran

Senior career*
Years	Team	Apps	(Gls)
1985–1987	Ards	43	(21)
1987–1993	Linfield	114	(51)
1993–1994	Distillery	25	(6)
1994–1998	Crusaders	108	(40)
1998–2000	Glenavon	48	(19)
2000–2002	Crusaders	58	(23)
2002	Bangor	0	(0)
2005	Crusaders	0	(0)
Total		396	(160)

International career
1981	Northern Ireland U16	3	(0)
1987	Irish League XI	2	(0)

Managerial career
- 2005–2024: Crusaders
- 2024–: Carrick Rangers
- * Club domestic league appearances and goals

Stephen John Baxter BEM (born 1 October 1965) is a Northern Irish football manager and retired footballer. He is manager of NIFL Premiership team Carrick Rangers. Baxter is known for his time at Crusaders, where he had two spells as a player, and served as manager for 19 years between 2005 and 2024.

In 2019, Baxter was awarded a British Empire Medal for services to football in Northern Ireland.

== Playing career ==
'Stanley' (as he would later be nicknamed after the Scottish comedian) started out as a player with Glentoran before signing for Ards in 1985. His goalscoring exploits caught the notice of Linfield and he signed for them in 1987, winning two Irish League championships, three Gold Cups and a League Cup. He scored 102 goals in 219 games for the Blues, of which 169 were starts.

Unable to hold down a regular starting place, however, he signed for Crusaders in 1994. Baxter became one of the key players of Crusaders' golden team of the 90's, again winning two Irish League championships, a Gold Cup and League Cup. In 1995/96, he was named in the Football Writers' Premier League Team of the Year, and in 1996/97 he was named as the Ulster Footballer of the Year. He then moved to Glenavon for a successful period before returning to Seaview for a second two-year spell in 2000.

Baxter was memorable for his hat-trick in a relegation play-off against Lisburn Distillery, ensuring the Crues' survival. Baxter left Seaview a firm fan-favourite and legend status for a short spell at Bangor, where he coached briefly and played two cup games, before retiring from football completely and opening a sports shop in Newtownards. He played a total of 650 games in his career, and scored 303 goals. He later came out of retirement briefly in a County Antrim Shield match against Dundela in 2005.

== Managerial career ==
=== Crusaders ===
Following the sacking of Alan Dornan, Baxter was installed as manager at Seaview, yet was unable to keep the Hatchetmen in the top division. After winning virtually every intermediate trophy in sight the following season, under Baxter's leadership the Crues returned to the Irish League and lead the table briefly, before finishing in 6th position in 2006–07.

After, he led the club to their first top 3 finish for a decade in 2008–09, and also the team's first Irish Cup victory in 41 years. He led the club to County Antrim Shield success the following season. Baxter is the club's most successful manager of all time.

In 2011–12, Baxter led the Crues to triumph in the Irish League Cup, winning the competition for the first time since 1996. That same season, he delivered success at the 2012 Setanta Sports Cup.

=== Carrick Rangers ===
On 8 October 2024, it was announced Baxter would take over as first team manager of Carrick Rangers on a 3 year deal.

== Managerial statistics ==
As of 21 November 2026

Team	Nation	From	To	Record							
Team	Nation	From	To	G	W	D	L	F	A	Gd	Win %
Crusaders	Northern Ireland	20 February 2005	17 July 2024	968	549	157	262	1,849	1,193	+656	56.71
Carrick Rangers	Northern Ireland	28 October 2024	present	108	37	28	43	167	171	-4	34.26
Total				1,076	586	185	305	2,016	1,364	+642	54.55

== Honours ==
=== As a player ===
Linfield

- Irish League: 1988–89, 1992–93
- Gold Cup: 1987–88, 1988–89, 1989–90
- Irish League Cup: 1991–92

Lisburn Distillery

- Gold Cup: 1993–94

Crusaders

- Irish League: 1994–95, 1996–97
- Gold Cup: 1995–96
- Irish League Cup: 1996–97

Glenavon

- Mid-Ulster Cup: 1998–99

Individual

- NIFWA Premier League Team of the Year: 1995–96
- Ulster Footballer of the Year: 1996–97
- NIFWA Player of the Year: 1996–97

=== As a manager ===
Crusaders

- NIFL Premiership: 2014–15, 2015–16, 2017–18
- Irish Cup: 2008–09, 2018–19, 2021–22, 2022–23
- Irish League Cup: 2011–12
- County Antrim Shield: 2009–10, 2017–18, 2018–19
- NIFL Charity Shield: 2022, 2023
- Setanta Sports Cup: 2012
- IFA Intermediate League: 2005–06
- IFA Intermediate League Cup: 2005–06
- Steel & Sons Cup: 2005–06

Carrick Rangers

- County Antrim Shield: 2025–26

== See also ==
- List of football managers with the most matches
