= Philip Lowry =

Northern Irish footballer (born 1989)

Personal information
- Date of birth: 15 July 1989 (age 37)
- Place of birth: Derry, Northern Ireland
- Position: Midfielder

Team information
- Current team: Limavady United
- Number: 7

Senior career*
Years	Team	Apps	(Gls)
2007–2009	Institute	46	(9)
2009–2014	Linfield	149	(32)
2014–2015	Derry City	40	(3)
2016	Portadown	7	(1)
2016–2025	Crusaders	233	(52)
2025–	Limavady United	37	(9)
- * Club domestic league appearances and goals as of 29 April 2026

Philip Lowry (born 15 July 1989) is a Northern Irish semi-professional footballer who plays as a midfielder for Limavady United. He has previously played for Portadown, Derry City, Linfield and Institute and Crusaders.

== Club career ==
Lowry began his career at 18 years of age with local side Institute, attracting interest from Coleraine and having trials with Norwich City and Leicester City at the age of 19. He moved to Linfield in 2009 and went on to win several major honours with the Blues before leaving in 2014 for his hometown club Derry City. While with Linfield Lowry scored what turned out to be the winning goal in the 2010 Irish Cup final.

In January 2016 he joined Portadown on a short-term contract until the end of the season, with Lowry flying over from London every week to play. In the summer of 2016 it was announced that Lowry had joined the champions Crusaders. On the final day of the 2017–18 season, with Crusaders a goal behind and needing to win to be crowned champions, Lowry scored a 77th-minute equaliser against Ballymena United, with Crusaders going on to win the match and the league title.

On 2 June 2025 his transfer from Crusaders to Limavady was announced.

== Honours ==
=== Club ===
Institute

- IFA Championship: 2006-07
- IFA Intermediate Cup: 2006-07
- North West Senior Cup: 2008-09

Linfield

- IFA Premiership: 2009–10, 2010–11, 2011–12
- Irish Cup: 2009–10, 2010–11, 2011–12
- County Antrim Shield: 2013–14

Crusaders

- NIFL Premiership: 2017–18
- Irish Cup: 2018–19, 2021–22, 2022–23
- County Antrim Shield: 2017–18, 2018–19
- NIFL Charity Shield: 2022

Limavady United

- NIFL Championship: 2025-26
