= Roy Walker (footballer) =

Northern Irish footballer and manager

Personal information
- Full name: Robert Wright Walker
- Date of birth: 1957 (age 68–69)
- Place of birth: Belfast, Northern Ireland
- Position: Centre-back

Youth career
- Torrin Boys

Senior career*
Years	Team	Apps	(Gls)
1972–1975	Luton Town	0	(0)
1975–1985	Ards		
1985–1986	Glenavon	7	(0)
1986–1987	Portadown	17	(0)
1987–1993	Crusaders	86	(2)

Managerial career
- 1989–1998: Crusaders
- 1998–2000: Glenavon
- 2007: Glentoran
- 2008–2011: Ballymena United
- * Club domestic league appearances and goals

Robert Wright "Roy" Walker (born 1957) is a football manager and former player. His most recent job was as manager of NIFL Premiership side Ballymena United.

== Playing career ==
Born to a working-class family in east Belfast, Walker began his career with Torrin Boys youth club, before moving to Luton Town in England. He returned to Northern Ireland to play for Ards, Glenavon, and Portadown. He finished his playing career with Crusaders.

Walker is also a Born-again Christian.

== Managerial career ==
=== Crusaders F.C. ===
He later became player-manager of Crusaders, in 1989. Walker was a player with Crusaders and was appointed manager in 1989. Walker brought huge success to the North Belfast club by winning the Irish League in 1995 and 1997, also winning the Gold Cup in 1996, the Ulster Cup in 1994, the County Antrim Shield in 1992, and the Stena Line Trophy in 1997, the same year he won the league. Walker had a very good number of players who would become Crusaders legends. Kirk Hunter was a fan favourite along with future manager of Crusaders Stephen Baxter. Other players included Sid Burrows, Glenn Dunlop, Kevin McKeown, Glenn Hunter, and future Glentoran pair Darren Lockhart and Chris Morgan. Walker stunned not only Crusaders fans but the whole Irish League by resigning from the club in 1998. He later became manager of Glenavon.

=== Glenavon F.C. ===
Walker became manager of the Lurgan Blues hoping to bring success as he did with Crusaders. He did bring a little success to Glenavon by winning the local Mid-Ulster Cup in 1999. Walker resigned in 2000. After leaving Glenavon on 31 July 2000 he became a pundit for BBC Radio Ulster.

=== Glentoran ===
After becoming a co-commentator for Northern Ireland's local radio show BBC Radio Ulster for Sportsound (the football show to cover all games and bring the final scores) Walker showed a huge interest in becoming new Glentoran manager after the sacking of Paul Miller. In May 2007 Millar was sacked as manager of Glentoran, and Walker finally realised his dream of being appointed Glens manager on 24 May. However, Walker had informed the Glentoran board before his appointment that he did not have the relevant UEFA "A" coaching badge to compete in Europe, the board informed him that this was not an issue and he was therefore Glentoran manager. Less than 48 hours later, it appeared that this was a problem for Glentoran and Walker was informed by then Glentoran Director For Football Tom Dick, that Alan McDonald (at the time Glentoran 1st team Coach) had been appointed caretaker manager. Roy Walker was not fired as Glentoran manager, and the resulting days became a media circus at the club, with some directors resigning.

On 29 May, Alan McDonald was appointed Glentoran manager. Roy Walker then issued a statement in the Belfast Telegraph, informing the fans of the entire situation, and revealing that he believed he was still Glentoran manager. He also revealed that he had been offered a place on the Glentoran board, but McDonald refused to be part of the club if Walker assumed that position. No board member issued a statement at that time, leaving many Glentoran fans unsure of the situation. The board later released a statement saying that Walker was considering a place on the Glentoran board.

=== Ballymena United ===
After failing for the Uefa badges as Glentoran, Walker was appointed new manager of Ballymena United. Walker has come close to a few cup finals but losing in the quarter-finals and knock out stages. Walker is currently still with the club. On 20 May 2008, Walker was announced as the new manager of Ballymena United, following another convoluted managerial situation. After the resignation of previous manager Tommy Wright, Ballymena had initially announced Wright's assistant Jim Grattan as his successor until the appointment was vetoed by Grattan's full-time employers, the Irish Football Association. Walker didn't win any trophies with the Sky Blues but brought the best out of players who didn't really get opportunities at former clubs, Gary McCutcheon and Gavin Taggart were two of those players who soon became key players at the club. Allan Jenkins, Dwayne Nelson and Wayne Drummond were also players who became key players. In the 2011/12 season, Walker resigned as manager after the Sky Blues lost to his former club Crusaders in the Irish League Cup semi-final on 13 December 2011.

== After Ballymena United ==
Walker is currently among the possible contenders to be new manager of East Belfast giants Glentoran. Walker applied for the job on 1 February 2012. Walker lost to former Cliftonville manager Eddie Patterson.

== Honours ==
Crusaders

- Irish League (2): 1994/95, 1996/97
- Gold Cup (1): 1995–96
- Ulster Cup (1): 1993/94
- County Antrim Shield (1): 1991–92
- Stena Line Trophy (1): 1996/97

Glenavon

- Mid-Ulster Cup (1): 1998/99

Individual

- Northern Ireland Football Writers Manager of the Year – 1997
