= Gavin Whyte =

Northern Irish association football player

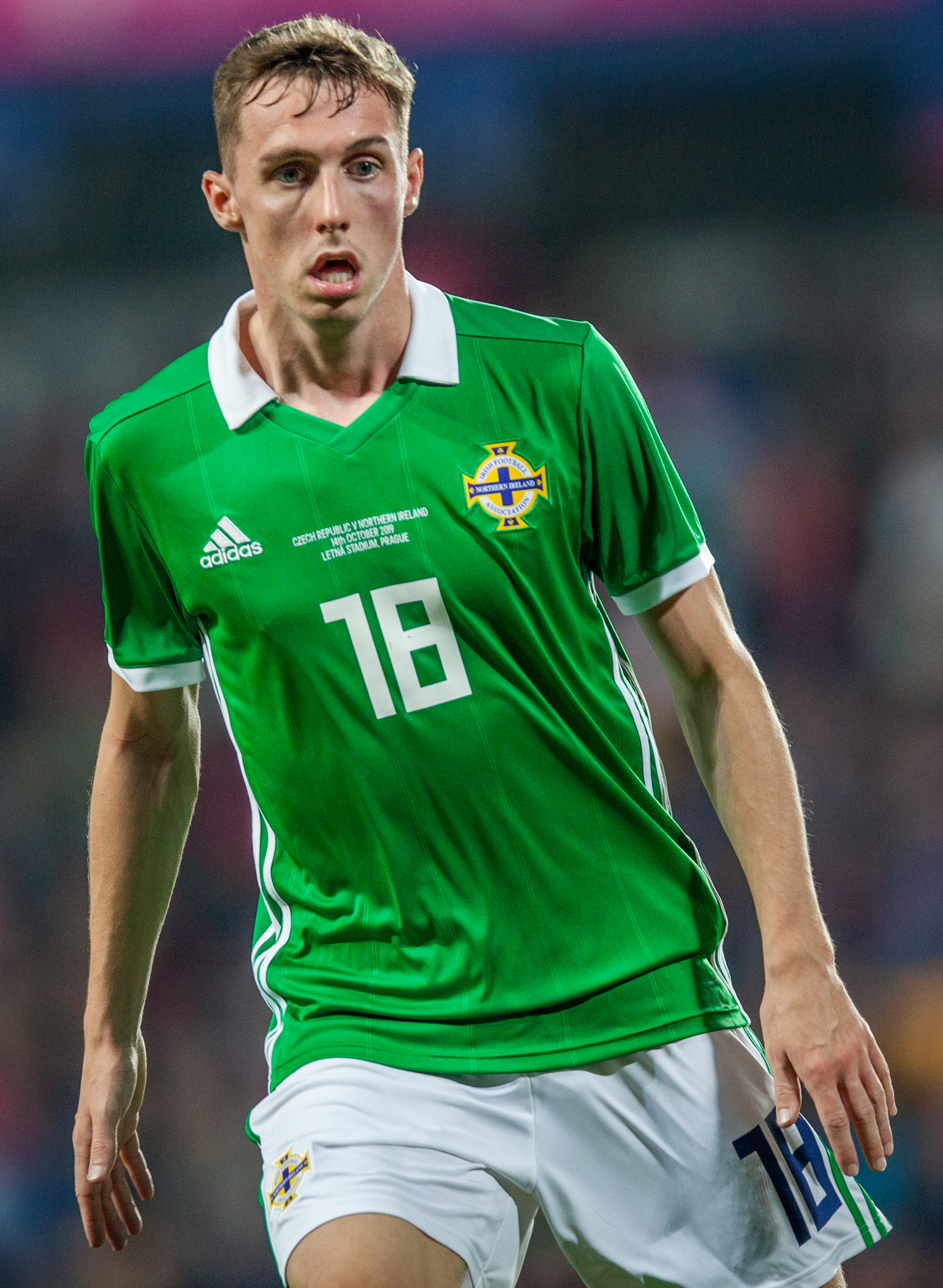
- Whyte playing for Northern Ireland in 2019

Personal information
- Full name: Gavin Whyte
- Date of birth: 31 January 1996 (age 30)
- Place of birth: Belfast, Northern Ireland
- Height: 5 ft 7 in (1.70 m)
- Positions: Winger; forward

Team information
- Current team: Derry City
- Number: 11

Youth career
- 2009–2014: Crusaders

Senior career*
| Years | Team | Apps | (Gls) |
| 2014–2018 | Crusaders | 132 | (43) |
| 2018–2019 | Oxford United | 36 | (7) |
| 2019–2023 | Cardiff City | 45 | (1) |
| 2021 | → Hull City (loan) | 20 | (4) |
| 2021–2022 | → Oxford United (loan) | 31 | (1) |
| 2023–2024 | Portsmouth | 29 | (0) |
| 2025– | Derry City | 36 | (4) |

International career^{‡}
| 2015–2018 | Northern Ireland U21 | 7 | (0) |
| 2018–2023 | Northern Ireland | 30 | (5) |
- * Club domestic league appearances and goals as of 16:28, 9 November 2026 (UTC) ‡ National team caps and goals as of 16:07, 19 January 2026 (UTC)

Gavin Whyte (born 31 January 1996) is a Northern Irish professional footballer who plays for League of Ireland Premier Division club Derry City and the Northern Ireland national team.

== Club career ==
=== Crusaders ===
Whyte's Crusaders team won three league titles in four years between 2015 and 2018 and he attracted interest from Scotland and England, most notably in trials with Premier League side Everton and Scottish side Celtic during the summer of 2016.

Whyte received the Player of the Round after his performance in the Scottish Challenge Cup quarter-finals in a game against defending champions Dundee United, when he netted an injury-time winner to send Crusaders into the semi-finals against Inverness Caledonian Thistle.

During the 2017–18 season he scored 24 goals in 49 games, winning his third NIFL Premiership league title and also the County Antrim Shield with Crusaders, and was voted the Ulster Footballer of the Year award for 2017–18 and also the Northern Ireland Football Writers' Association Player of the Year award for 2017–18.

=== Oxford United ===
On 13 July 2018, Oxford United announced the signing of Whyte on a three-year deal, for an undisclosed transfer fee. He made his debut as an 82nd-minute substitute in Oxford's opening league match of the season, a 4–0 away defeat at Barnsley. His first start, and first goal, came in the first round of the EFL Cup against Coventry City ten days later; Whyte scored the second goal in a 2–0 win for Oxford. His first league goal followed in the next game, when he scored the opener in a 2–3 home defeat to Accrington Stanley. On 22 April 2019, Whyte scored his first hat-trick for the club, in a 2–3 away win against Shrewsbury Town. By the end of his first and only season with Oxford, he had scored 9 times in 47 appearances (7 of them in League One matches).

=== Cardiff City ===
On 30 July 2019, Whyte signed for Championship club Cardiff City for an undisclosed seven-figure fee. He made his debut on the opening day of the 2019–20 season as a substitute in place of Josh Murphy during a 3–2 defeat to Wigan Athletic.

Whyte joined League One club Hull City on a six-month loan deal on 14 January 2021. He made his debut on 16 January 2021 in a 1–1 draw at home to Blackpool. The following match on 19 January 2021, he scored in the 3–0 home win against Accrington Stanley.

On 31 July 2021, Whyte signed a one-year loan deal with Oxford United.

=== Portsmouth ===
Whyte joined EFL League One club Portsmouth in the summer of 2023, making his debut in the opening match at home against Bristol Rovers. In his first season he played 33 matches, with his only goal coming in the EFL Trophy.

On 30 August 2024 Whyte departed Portsmouth by mutual consent.

=== Derry City ===
On 11 January 2025 Whyte signed a three-year contract with Derry City. On 8 November 2026, he was an unused substitute in the 2026 FAI Cup final as his side defeated Waterford 1–0 at the Aviva Stadium.

== International career ==
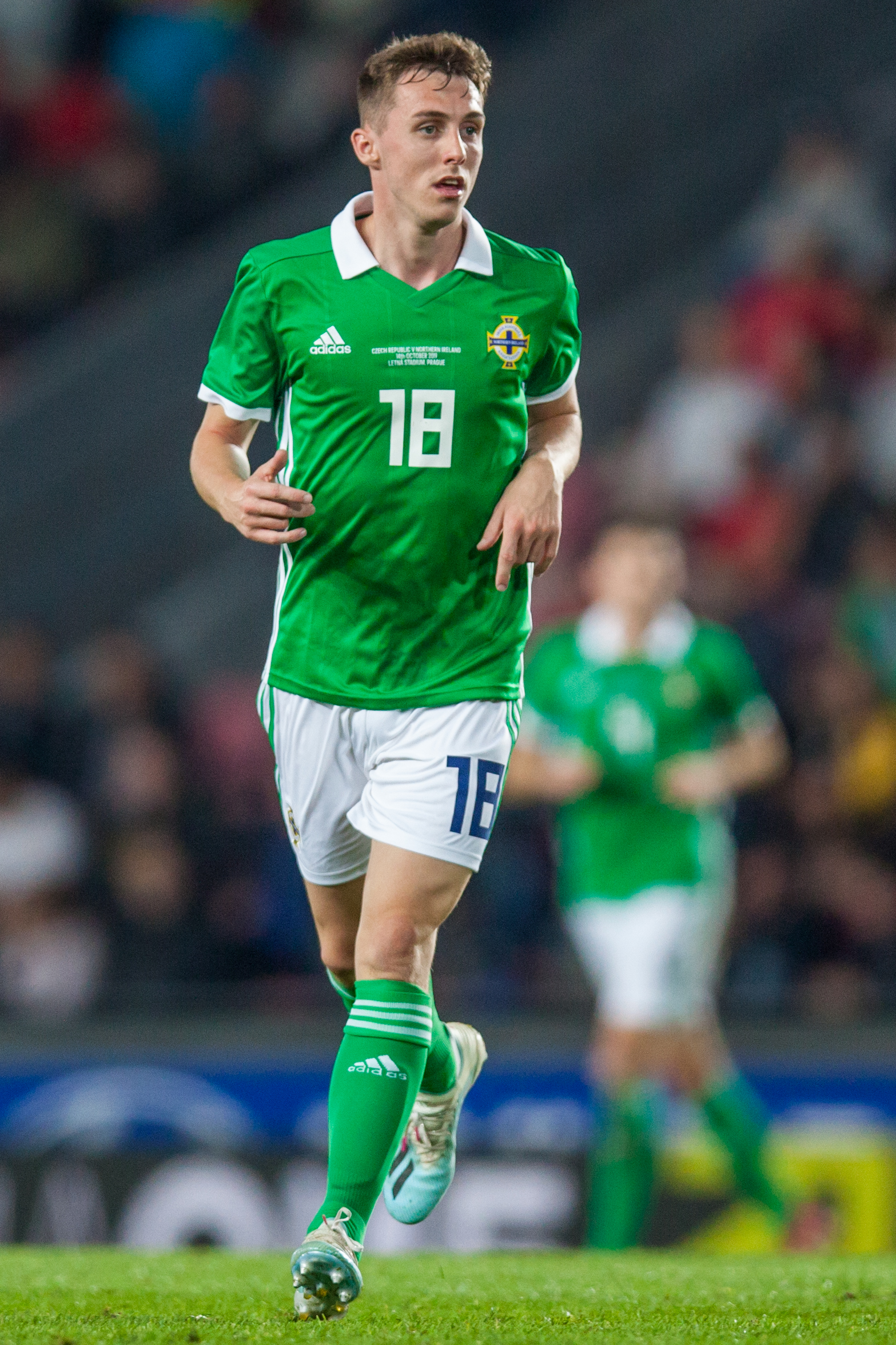
Whyte playing for Northern Ireland in 2019

On 14 March 2018, after impressing for Crusaders, Whyte was called up the Northern Ireland U21 squad by Manager Ian Baraclough for matches against Spain U21s and Iceland U21s in the European Under-21 Championships qualifying group stage fixtures. He impressed on 26 March 2018, as Northern Ireland U21 played out a goalless draw with Iceland.

On 16 May 2018, after impressing at club level and for the U21s, Whyte was named in Northern Ireland's squad ahead of friendlies against Panama and Costa Rica.

On 11 September 2018 Whyte scored on his Northern Ireland senior debut, scoring after 108 seconds in a 3–0 win against Israel at Windsor Park.

== Career statistics ==
=== Club ===
As of match played 30 November 2026

Appearances and goals by club, season and competition
| Club | Season | League | | | National Cup | | League Cup | | Other | | Total | |
| Club | Season | Division | Apps | Goals | Apps | Goals | Apps | Goals | Apps | Goals | Apps | Goals |
|---|---|---|---|---|---|---|---|---|---|---|---|---|
| Crusaders | 2013–14 | NIFL Premiership | 1 | 0 | 0 | 0 | 0 | 0 | 0 | 0 | 1 | 0 |
| Crusaders | 2014–15 | NIFL Premiership | 34 | 9 | 2 | 1 | 1 | 0 | 0 | 0 | 37 | 10 |
| Crusaders | 2015–16 | NIFL Premiership | 27 | 3 | 3 | 0 | 0 | 0 | 1 (Note: Appearance(s) in NIFL Charity Shield) | 0 | 31 | 3 |
| Crusaders | 2016–17 | NIFL Premiership | 34 | 10 | 1 | 0 | 0 | 0 | 2 (Note: One appearance in UEFA Champions League, one in NIFL Charity Shield) | 0 | 37 | 10 |
| Crusaders | 2017–18 | NIFL Premiership | 36 | 21 | 1 | 1 | 2 | 1 | 5 (Note: Two appearances in UEFA Europa League, three appearances and one goal in Scottish Challenge Cup) | 1 | 44 | 24 |
| Crusaders | Total | | 132 | 43 | 7 | 2 | 3 | 1 | 8 | 1 | 150 | 47 |
| Oxford United | 2018–19 | League One | 36 | 7 | 4 | 0 | 3 | 2 | 4 (Note: Appearances in EFL Trophy) | 0 | 47 | 9 |
| Cardiff City | 2019–20 | Championship | 24 | 0 | 4 | 1 | 1 | 0 | 1 (Note: Appearances in Championship play-offs) | 0 | 30 | 1 |
| Cardiff City | 2020–21 | Championship | 7 | 0 | 0 | 0 | 0 | 0 | – | | 7 | 0 |
| Cardiff City | 2022–23 | Championship | 14 | 1 | 1 | 0 | 1 | 0 | – | | 16 | 1 |
| Cardiff City | Total | | 45 | 1 | 5 | 1 | 2 | 0 | 1 | 0 | 53 | 2 |
| Hull City (loan) | 2020–21 | League One | 20 | 4 | 0 | 0 | 0 | 0 | – | | 20 | 4 |
| Oxford United (loan) | 2021–22 | League One | 37 | 1 | 1 | 0 | 1 | 0 | – | | 39 | 1 |
| Portsmouth | 2023–24 | League One | 29 | 0 | 1 | 0 | 0 | 0 | 3 | 1 | 33 | 1 |
| Portsmouth | 2024–25 | Championship | 0 | 0 | 0 | 0 | 1 | 0 | – | | 1 | 0 |
| Portsmouth | Total | | 29 | 0 | 1 | 0 | 1 | 0 | 3 | 1 | 34 | 1 |
| Derry City | 2025 | LOI Premier Division | 30 | 4 | 2 | 0 | — | | — | | 32 | 4 |
| Derry City | 2026 | LOI Premier Division | 6 | 0 | 0 | 0 | — | | 0 | 0 | 6 | 0 |
| Derry City | Total | | 36 | 4 | 2 | 0 | — | | 0 | 0 | 38 | 4 |
| Career total | | | 335 | 60 | 20 | 3 | 10 | 3 | 16 | 2 | 381 | 68 |

=== International ===
As of match played 26 March 2023

Appearances and goals by national team and year
| National team | Year | Apps | Goals |
|---|---|---|---|
| Northern Ireland | 2018 | 4 | 1 |
| Northern Ireland | 2019 | 5 | 0 |
| Northern Ireland | 2020 | 6 | 1 |
| Northern Ireland | 2021 | 6 | 1 |
| Northern Ireland | 2022 | 7 | 2 |
| Northern Ireland | 2023 | 2 | 0 |
| Total | | 30 | 5 |

Scores and results list Northern Ireland's goal tally first.

List of international goals scored by Gavin Whyte
| No. | Date | Venue | Opponent | Score | Result | Competition |
|---|---|---|---|---|---|---|
| 1 | 11 September 2018 | Windsor Park, Belfast, Northern Ireland | Israel | 3–0 | 3–0 | Friendly |
| 2 | 4 September 2020 | Arena Națională, Bucharest, Romania | Romania | 1–1 | 1–1 | 2020–21 UEFA Nations League B |
| 3 | 30 May 2021 | Wörthersee Stadion, Klagenfurt, Austria | Malta | 2–0 | 3–0 | Friendly |
| 4 | 25 March 2022 | Stade de Luxembourg, Luxembourg City, Luxembourg | Luxembourg | 3–1 | 3–1 | Friendly |
| 5 | 24 September 2022 | Windsor Park, Belfast, Northern Ireland | Kosovo | 1–1 | 2–1 | 2022–23 UEFA Nations League C |

== Honours ==
Crusaders

- NIFL Premiership: 2014–15, 2015–16, 2017–18
- County Antrim Shield: 2017–18

Hull City

- EFL League One: 2020–21

Portsmouth

- EFL League One: 2023–24

Derry City

- FAI Cup: 2026

Individual

- Ulster Footballer of the Year: 2017–18
- NIFWA Player of the Year: 2017–18
