= Billy Joe Burns =

Northern Irish footballer

Personal information
- Date of birth: 28 April 1989 (age 37)
- Place of birth: Belfast, Northern Ireland
- Position: Full back

Team information
- Current team: Carrick Rangers
- Number: 2

Senior career*
Years	Team	Apps	(Gls)
2008–2014	Linfield	140	(13)
2014–2025	Crusaders	325	(24)
2025–	Carrick Rangers	30	(2)
- * Club domestic league appearances and goals as of 29 April 2026

William Joseph Burns (born 28 April 1989), widely known as Billy Joe Burns, is a footballer from Northern Ireland who plays as a full back for Carrick Rangers.

== Career ==
Burns previously played for Linfield before joining Crusaders in 2014. He was named as Ulster Footballer of the Year and Northern Ireland Football Writers' Association Player of the Year for 2015–16.

== Honours ==
Linfield

- NIFL Premiership: 2009–10, 2010–11, 2011–12
- Irish Cup: 2009–10, 2010–11, 2011–12

Crusaders

- NIFL Premiership: 2014–15, 2015–16, 2017–18
- Irish Cup: 2018–19, 2021–22 2022–23
- County Antrim Shield: 2017–18, 2018–19
- NIFL Charity Shield: 2022

Carrick Rangers

- County Antrim Shield: 2025–26

Individual awards

- Linfield Player of the Year: 2012–13
- Ulster Footballer of the Year: 2015–16
- NIFWA Player of the Year: 2015–16
