= 1994–95 Gold Cup =

Tournament details
- Country: Northern Ireland
- Teams: 16

Final positions
- Champions: Glentoran (11th win)
- Runners-up: Crusaders

Tournament statistics
- Matches played: 31
- Goals scored: 102 (3.29 per match)

The 1994–95 Gold Cup was the 76th edition of the Gold Cup, a cup competition in Northern Irish football.

The tournament was won by Glentoran for the 11th time, defeating Crusaders 3–0 on penalties in the final at Windsor Park after the match had finished in a 1–1 draw.

== Group standings ==
=== Section A ===
Pos	Team	Pld	W	D	L	GF	GA	GD	Pts	Result
1	Linfield	3	3	0	0	9	1	+8	9	Advance to quarter-final
2	Coleraine	3	2	0	1	5	4	+1	6	Advance to quarter-final
3	Distillery	3	1	0	2	5	8	−3	3	
4	Larne	3	0	0	3	2	8	−6	0	

Source: Irish League Archive

=== Section B ===
Pos	Team	Pld	W	D	L	GF	GA	GD	Pts	Result
1	Ballymena United	3	2	0	1	5	3	+2	6	Advance to quarter-final
2	Portadown	3	2	0	1	3	2	+1	6	Advance to quarter-final
3	Bangor	3	2	0	1	3	3	0	6	
4	Omagh Town	3	0	0	3	2	5	−3	0	

Source: Irish League Archive

=== Section C ===
Pos	Team	Pld	W	D	L	GF	GA	GD	Pts	Result
1	Glenavon	3	2	1	0	12	2	+10	7	Advance to quarter-final
2	Cliftonville	3	2	0	1	6	7	−1	6	Advance to quarter-final
3	Ballyclare Comrades	3	1	0	2	4	7	−3	3	
4	Newry Town	3	0	1	2	5	11	−6	1	

Source: Irish League Archive

=== Section D ===
Pos	Team	Pld	W	D	L	GF	GA	GD	Pts	Result
1	Glentoran	3	3	0	0	10	3	+7	9	Advance to quarter-final
2	Crusaders	3	1	1	1	6	7	−1	4	Advance to quarter-final
3	Carrick Rangers	3	1	1	1	3	5	−2	4	
4	Ards	3	0	0	3	2	6	−4	0	

Source: Irish League Archive

== Quarter-finals ==
Team 1	Score	Team 2
Ballymena United	0–1	Coleraine
Glenavon	0–1	Crusaders
Glentoran	2–1	Cliftonville
Linfield	2–2 (a.e.t.) (4–3 p)	Portadown

== Semi-finals ==
Team 1	Score	Team 2
Crusaders	2–1	Linfield
Glentoran	4–2	Coleraine

== Final ==
25 October 1994

Glentoran	1–1 (a.e.t.)	Crusaders
Campbell 8'		Murray 32'
Penalties
Parker (penalty scored); Kelly (penalty scored); Nixon (penalty scored)	3–0	(penalty missed) McCartney; (penalty missed) Dunlop; (penalty missed) Burrows

Windsor Park, Belfast
Referee: David Magill (Belfast)
