= 2016–17 County Antrim Shield =

Tournament details
- Country: Northern Ireland
- Teams: 16

Final positions
- Champions: Linfield (43rd win)
- Runners-up: Crusaders

Tournament statistics
- Matches played: 15
- Goals scored: 57 (3.8 per match)

The 2016–17 County Antrim Shield was the 128th edition of the County Antrim Shield, a cup competition in Northern Irish football.

Linfield won the tournament for the 43rd time, defeating Crusaders 3–1 in the final.

== Results ==
=== First round ===
Team 1	Score	Team 2
Ards	3–1	Knockbreda
Ballyclare Comrades	0–1	Glentoran
Ballymena United	3–0	Harland & Wolff Welders
Carrick Rangers	1–4	PSNI
Cliftonville	7–1	Bangor
Larne	0–2	Crusaders
Linfield	4–0	Donegal Celtic
Newington Youth	0–1	Albert Foundry

=== Quarter-finals ===
Team 1	Score	Team 2
Albert Foundry	0–3	PSNI
Ballymena United	1–2	Ards
Glentoran	1–2 (a.e.t.)	Crusaders
Linfield	3–0	Cliftonville

=== Semi-finals ===
Team 1	Score	Team 2
Crusaders	4–2	PSNI
Linfield	6–1	Ards

=== Final ===
7 February 2017

Linfield	3–1	Crusaders
Stewart 3'; Stafford 12'; Lowry 79'	Report	Owens 33'; Heatley (red card) 30'

The Showgrounds, Ballymena
Referee: Mervyn Smyth
