= Paul Heatley =

Northern Irish footballer

Personal information
- Date of birth: 30 June 1987 (age 39)
- Place of birth: Belfast, Northern Ireland
- Position: Winger

Senior career*
Years	Team	Apps	(Gls)
2004–2008	Cliftonville	3	(0)
2008–2009	Newry City		
2009–2011	Brantwood		
2011–2012	Carrick Rangers	36	(10)
2012–2024	Crusaders	374	(175)
2024-	Carrick Rangers	58	(22)
- * Club domestic league appearances and goals as of 29 April 2026

Paul Heatley (born 30 June 1987) is a footballer from Northern Ireland who plays as a winger for Carrick Rangers. Heatley is considered one of the top Irish League players of the modern era.

Heatley previously played for Cliftonville, Newry City, Brantwood and Carrick Rangers before joining Crusaders in 2012. He was named as Ulster Footballer of the Year and Northern Ireland Football Writers' Player of the Year for 2014–15.

== Honours ==
Crusaders

- NIFL Premiership: 2014–15, 2015–16, 2017–18
- Irish Cup: 2018–19, 2021–22, 2022–23
- County Antrim Shield: 2017–18, 2018–19
- NIFL Charity Shield: 2022

Carrick Rangers

- County Antrim Shield: 2025–26

Individual

- Ulster Footballer of the Year: 2014–15
- Northern Ireland Football Writers' Association Player of the Year: 2014–15
