= 1969–70 Irish League =

Irish League
- Season: 1969–70
- Champions: Glentoran; 14th Irish title
- Matches played: 132
- Goals scored: 440 (3.33 per match)
- Top goalscorer: Des Dickson (21 goals)

Location of teams in the Irish League from 1949–1972
Location of Belfast-based teams in the Irish League from 1949–1971

The 1969–70 Irish League was the 69th edition of the Irish League, the highest level of league competition in Northern Irish football. The league consisted of 12 teams, and Glentoran won the championship.

== League standings ==
Pos	Team	Pld	W	D	L	GF	GA	GR	Pts	Qualification
1	Glentoran	22	14	6	2	46	17	2.706	34	European Cup preliminary round and Inter-Cities Fairs Cup
2	Coleraine	22	12	3	7	50	31	1.613	27	Participated in the Inter-Cities Fairs Cup
3	Ards	22	10	7	5	41	26	1.577	27	
4	Linfield	22	11	5	6	48	36	1.333	27	Qualification for the European Cup Winners' Cup first round
5	Derry City	22	11	5	6	38	31	1.226	27	
6	Portadown	22	11	3	8	42	37	1.135	25	
7	Glenavon	22	7	8	7	32	36	0.889	22	
8	Bangor	22	6	7	9	32	36	0.889	19	
9	Crusaders	22	8	3	11	42	52	0.808	19	
10	Ballymena United	22	5	6	11	24	42	0.571	16	
11	Distillery	22	5	5	12	25	45	0.556	15	
12	Cliftonville	22	1	4	17	20	51	0.392	6	

Source: rsssf.com

== Results ==
Home \ Away	ARD	BAN	BLM	CLI	COL	CRU	DIS	DER	GLV	GLT	LIN	POR
Ards		2–1	4–1	3–1	1–1	2–1	1–0	4–0	0–1	2–3	2–3	4–1
Bangor	2–2		3–4	3–1	0–1	3–4	3–1	1–1	1–0	1–1	3–2	2–0
Ballymena United	1–2	2–2		1–1	1–5	2–0	0–0	3–4	3–1	0–3	0–4	1–3
Cliftonville	0–2	0–1	0–1		3–1	0–2	1–3	2–3	3–3	0–3	1–5	1–2
Coleraine	2–1	2–2	3–0	1–0		2–1	6–1	1–1	1–3	2–0	3–1	2–3
Crusaders	1–1	1–0	1–1	8–3	0–7		2–1	0–3	4–1	2–0	1–3	6–2
Distillery	0–0	1–1	1–0	1–1	0–3	4–3		2–4	5–0	0–5	0–1	2–0
Derry City	3–2	2–1	0–2	2–0	0–1	1–0	4–1		0–1	0–0	1–1	0–4
Glenavon	0–2	1–1	3–0	2–1	4–2	1–1	0–0	1–1		2–2	5–2	0–2
Glentoran	1–1	2–0	0–0	2–0	2–1	7–2	3–0	1–0	2–0		2–2	2–1
Linfield	2–2	4–1	1–0	1–1	4–2	4–1	3–0	2–4	1–1	0–2		0–3
Portadown	1–1	2–0	1–1	1–0	3–1	4–1	4–2	1–4	2–2	1–3	1–2	

Source: Irish League Archive
Legend: Blue = home team win; Yellow = draw; Red = away team win.
