= Jackie Hutton =

Scottish footballer and manager

Personal information
- Full name: John Hutton
- Date of birth: 23 April 1944
- Place of birth: Bellshill, Scotland
- Date of death: 20 May 2015 (aged 71)
- Place of death: Belfast, Northern Ireland
- Position: Right winger

Youth career
- 1961: Wishaw Juniors

Senior career*
| Years | Team | Apps | (Gls) |
| 1961–1963 | Hamilton Academical | 39 | (13) |
| 1963–1966 | Scunthorpe United | 54 | (7) |
| 1966–1967 | St. Mirren | 22 | (2) |
| 1967–1971 | Glentoran | 87 | (18) |
| 1971–1975 | Portadown | | |
| 1975–1976 | Cliftonville | | |

Managerial career
- 1976–1979: Cliftonville
- 1979–1983: Portadown
- 1986–1989: Crusaders
- * Club domestic league appearances and goals

Jackie Hutton (23 April 1944 – 20 May 2015) was a Scottish football player and manager. He played for Wishaw Juniors early in his football career and then most notably for Scunthorpe United.

== Playing career ==
He began his playing career with Lanarkshire side Wishaw Juniors when he was 17. He was quickly snapped up by Scottish Second Division Hamilton Academicals where he played from 1961 to 1963 scoring 13 goals in 39 league appearances. In 1963 he moved to England to join second division Scunthorpe United. He spent three seasons with Scunthorpe scoring seven times in 54 league outings and once quipped about his time there that, "The only time we hit the headlines was when we were relegated to the Third Division in my third season". It was during his time with Scunthorpe that he married his wife, a Belfast girl.

Following that relegation in 1966 Jackie found himself on the move again, this time back to Scotland where he joined St. Mirren, spending one season with the Paisley 'Buddies' scoring twice in 22 league games. With his Belfast bride, Jackie moved to Northern Ireland in 1967 working in the civil service. He joined Glentoran under fellow Scot John Colrain, spending four seasons with the East Belfast club, scoring 18 goals in 87 games. At The Oval Jackie won two Irish League winners and one City Cup winners medals.

In May 1971 he was on the move once more, this time to Portadown and another Scots manager, Gibby MacKenzie. His Portadown debut was delayed due to the Troubles and with the country in turmoil, the opening Ulster Cup games were postponed. In midweek however he made his debut in a dramatic Mid-Ulster derby at Mourneview Park against Glenavon on 19 August 1971, with the Ports winning 4–3. It was to be a winning start to his Ports career, picking up a Gold Cup winners medal in a 2–1 final replay success against Ards at Mourneview Park in May 1972. This made up for the bitter disappointment of losing the Irish Cup Final 2–1 against Coleraine the previous month. A year later Linfield defeated Portadown 2–0 in the Gold Cup final but Hutton did add to his trophy haul however, captaining the Ports to the Carlsberg Cup with a 3–0 win over Ards at Windsor Park.

The silverware kept on coming back to Shamrock Park and in season 1973-74 it was the All-Ireland Texaco Cup which nestled in the Shamrock Park trophy cabinet. Hutton captained The Ports to a 5-3 aggregate success in the two leg final against Bohemians.

The following season there was a measure of European success as Portadown beat Icelandic side Valur of Reykjavík in the first round before losing 6–1 on aggregate to Partizan Belgrade.

== Managerial career ==
In 1975/76 Hutton was transferred to Cliftonville and went on to manage the Reds to an Irish Cup Final victory against Portadown in 1979. Five months later Hutton would return to Shamrock Park as manager following the departure of Bertie Neill. His first game in charge was a disastrous 5–1 defeat at the hands of Linfield. He remained in charge until August 1983, when he was sacked after a poor start to the season. Ironically on the day he and assistant Jackie Patterson were notified of their dismissal, the Ports thumped Bangor 6–1 at Shamrock Park.

He also managed Cliftonville's rivals Crusaders, where he is best remembered for appointing Roy Walker as his assistant, who went on to become one of the greatest managers in Crusaders' history.
