= Jordan Owens (footballer) =

Northern Irish footballer (born 1989)

Personal information
- Date of birth: 9 July 1989 (age 37)
- Place of birth: Belfast, Northern Ireland
- Height: 6 ft 2 in (1.88 m)
- Position: Striker

Team information
- Current team: Crusaders
- Number: 18

Youth career
- 2005–2007: Crusaders

Senior career*
Years	Team	Apps	(Gls)
2007–	Crusaders	549	(199)

International career^{‡}
2007–2008	Northern Ireland U19	2	(1)
2008–2010	Northern Ireland U21	2	(0)
2010	Northern Ireland U23	2	(1)
2011	Northern Ireland	1	(0)
- * Club domestic league appearances and goals as of 26 April 2025 ‡ National team caps and goals as of 27 May 2011

Jordan Owens (born 9 July 1989) is a Northern Irish footballer who plays for NIFL Premiership side Crusaders as a striker. He is the club's all-time top goalscorer, having surpassed the record held by Glenn Hunter in January 2016.

== Club career ==
Owens came up through the Crusaders youth system, and after impressive displays for the reserves, he made his debut towards the end of the 2007/08 season, scoring his first goal against Larne. He also scored the opening goal in a 4–1 Irish Cup semi-final victory over Institute to take the Crues into their first Irish Cup final in 29 years, and repeated the feat in 2011, scoring against Portadown in another Irish Cup semi final.

In the 2014–15 season he hit 30 goals as Crusaders finished as league champions. In January 2016 he scored against Rathfriland Rangers to break the Crusaders goalscoring record of 157, held since 1997 by Glenn Hunter. He is also the all-time top goalscorer in North Belfast derby matches with Crusaders' nearest rivals Cliftonville.

On 6 March 2018, Owens scored a hat-trick in a league match against Glenavon to surpass 200 goals for Crusaders, becoming the first player to reach this milestone for the club.

== International career ==
He has represented Northern Ireland at U19, U21, and U23 level, scoring for the U23s against Poland He received a call-up to the full squad, along with team-mates Stuart Dallas and Colin Coates, for the 2011 Nations Cup games against Republic of Ireland and Wales. He made his debut against Wales, coming on in the 79th minute.

== Career statistics ==
As of match played on 7 May 2025

Appearances and goals by club, season and competition
Club	Season	League		Cup		League Cup		Other		Continental		Total	
Club	Season	Apps	Goals	Apps	Goals	Apps	Goals	Apps	Goals	Apps	Goals	Apps	Goals
Crusaders	2006–07	0	0	2	0	0	0	0	0	—		2	0
Crusaders	2007–08	12	4	1	0	0	0	0	0	—		13	4
Crusaders	2008–09	32	12	5	2	1	0	2 (Note: Appearances in the County Antrim Shield.)	1	—		40	15
Crusaders	2009–10	32	8	4	2	2	1	3	1	2 (Note: Appearances in the UEFA Europa League.)	1	43	13
Crusaders	2010–11	32	20	4	2	4	2	3 (Note: Appearances in the County Antrim Shield and Setanta Sports Cup.)	0	—		43	24
Crusaders	2011–12	34	9	5	1	3	3	5	1	2	0	49	14
Crusaders	2012–13	33	16	5	1	5	1	4	1	2	0	49	19
Crusaders	2013–14	37	16	4	3	4	3	5	0	2	2	52	24
Crusaders	2014–15	37	26	3	0	2	2	2	1	4	1	48	30
Crusaders	2015–16	37	18	3	1	1	0	2 (Note: Appearances in the NIFL Charity Shield and County Antrim Shield.)	0	4 (Note: Appearances in the UEFA Champions League.)	1	47	20
Crusaders	2016–17	37	20	2	0	2	0	3	1	2	0	46	21
Crusaders	2017–18	35	17	1	0	3	0	7 (Note: Appearances in the County Antrim Shield and Scottish Challenge Cup.)	2	2	1	48	20
Crusaders	2018–19	25	7	5	5	2	2	1	0	2	0	35	14
Crusaders	2019–20	26	11	2	2	1	0	0	0	4	0	33	13
Crusaders	2020–21	31	7	3	1	—		2	0	—		36	8
Crusaders	2021–22	30	0	4	2	2	3	2	0	—		38	5
Crusaders	2022–23	26	3	5	1	1	0	0	0	3	0	35	4
Crusaders	2023–24	30	4	1	0	2	0	4 (Note: Appearances in the NIFL Charity Shield, County Antrim Shield and UEFA Conference League playoffs.)	1	4 (Note: Appearances in the UEFA Europa Conference League.)	0	41	5
Crusaders	2024–25	22	1	1	0	2	0	4 (Note: Appearances in the County Antrim Shield and UEFA Conference League playoffs.)	1	1	0	30	2
Career total		548	199	60	23	37	17	49	10	34	6	728	255

== Honours ==
Crusaders

- NIFL Premiership: 2014–15, 2015–16, 2017–18
- Irish Cup: 2008–09, 2018–19, 2021–22, 2022–23
- Setanta Cup: 2012
- Irish League Cup: 2011–12
- County Antrim Shield: 2009–10, 2017–18, 2018–19
- NIFL Charity Shield: 2022
