= 1991–92 County Antrim Shield =

Tournament details
- Country: Northern Ireland
- Teams: 16

Final positions
- Champions: Crusaders (5th win)
- Runners-up: Glenavon

Tournament statistics
- Matches played: 15
- Goals scored: 42 (2.8 per match)

The 1991–92 County Antrim Shield was the 103rd edition of the County Antrim Shield, a cup competition in Northern Irish football.

Crusaders won the tournament for the 5th time, defeating Glenavon 2–1 in the final. For the 6th year running the County Antrim FA invited three clubs from County Armagh to compete (Glenavon, Newry Town and Portadown).

== Results ==
=== First round ===
Team 1	Score	Team 2
Ballyclare Comrades	2–1	Cliftonville
Bangor	3–1	Brantwood
Carrick Rangers	1–2	Glentoran
Comber Recreation	0–5	Ards
Distillery	0–3	Portadown
Larne	1–1 (a.e.t.) (0–3 p)	Glenavon
Linfield	1–0	Ballymena United
Newry Town	1–1 (a.e.t.) (4–5 p)	Crusaders

=== Quarter-finals ===
Team 1	Score	Team 2
Ballyclare Comrades	1–3	Ards
Bangor	0–0 (a.e.t.) (4–5 p)	Crusaders
Glenavon	4–1	Glentoran
Portadown	1–0	Linfield

=== Semi-finals ===
Team 1	Score	Team 2
Crusaders	3–0	Ards
Glenavon	2–1	Portadown

=== Final ===
28 January 1992

Crusaders	2–1	Glenavon
Burrows 48' (pen.); McDonald 60'	Report	McConville 32'; Conville (red card) 48'

The Oval, Belfast
Referee: David Magill (Belfast)
