= Glenn Hunter =

Glenn Hunter may refer to:

- Glenn Hunter (footballer) (born 1967), former footballer from Northern Ireland
- Glenn Hunter (actor) (1894–1945), stage and silent film actor
