= 2010–11 County Antrim Shield =

Tournament details
- Country: Northern Ireland
- Teams: 8

Final positions
- Champions: Glentoran (26th win)
- Runners-up: Linfield

Tournament statistics
- Matches played: 7
- Goals scored: 35 (5 per match)

The 2010–11 County Antrim Shield was the 122nd edition of the County Antrim Shield, a cup competition in Northern Irish football.

Glentoran won the tournament for the 26th time, defeating Linfield 3–1 in the final, the latter being runner-up for the third year in a row.

== Results ==
=== Quarter-finals ===
Team 1	Score	Team 2
Ballymena United	0–1	Crusaders
Cliftonville	0–2	Linfield
Donegal Celtic	4–4 (a.e.t.) (3–5 p)	Kilmore Recreation
Glentoran	4–2	Lisburn Distillery

=== Semi-finals ===
Team 1	Score	Team 2
Glentoran	2–1	Crusaders
Linfield	11–0	Kilmore Recreation

=== Final ===
30 November 2010

Linfield	1–3	Glentoran
Burns 84'	Report	Waterworth 8' (pen.); Burrows 23'; Gardiner 90'

Windsor Park, Belfast
