= 2013–14 County Antrim Shield =

Tournament details
- Country: Northern Ireland
- Teams: 8

Final positions
- Champions: Linfield (42nd win)
- Runners-up: Crusaders

Tournament statistics
- Matches played: 7
- Goals scored: 18 (2.57 per match)

The 2013–14 County Antrim Shield was the 125th edition of the County Antrim Shield, a cup competition in Northern Irish football.

Linfield won the tournament for the 42nd time, defeating Crusaders 4–1 on penalties in the final after the match had finished 0–0.

== Results ==
=== Quarter-finals ===
Team 1	Score	Team 2
Ballymena United	1–0	Donegal Celtic
Crusaders	3–0	Lisburn Distillery
Glentoran	0–3	Cliftonville
Linfield	3–2	Ards

=== Semi-finals ===
Team 1	Score	Team 2
Crusaders	1–0	Ballymena United
Linfield	4–1	Cliftonville

=== Final ===
4 March 2014

Linfield	0–0 (a.e.t.)	Crusaders
	Report
Penalties
Waterworth (penalty scored); A. Burns (penalty scored); Carvill (penalty scored); B. J. Burns (penalty scored)	4–1	(penalty scored) McCutcheon; (penalty missed) Hanley; (penalty missed) E. McAllister

The Showgrounds, Ballymena
Attendance: 1,600
Referee: Hugh Carvill (Belfast)
