= 1975–76 Irish League =

Northern Irish football season

Irish League
- Season: 1975–76
- Champions: Crusaders; 2nd Irish title
- Matches played: 132
- Goals scored: 426 (3.23 per match)
- Top goalscorer: Des Dickson (23 goals)

Location of teams in the Irish League from 1975–79
Location of Belfast-based teams in the Irish League from 1975–79

The 1975–76 Irish League was the 75th edition of the Irish League, the highest level of league competition in Northern Irish football. The league consisted of 12 teams, and the Crusaders won the championship.

== League standings ==
Pos	Team	Pld	W	D	L	GF	GA	GR	Pts	Qualification
1	Crusaders (C)	22	15	6	1	51	19	2.684	36	Qualification for the European Cup first round
2	Glentoran	22	14	4	4	48	22	2.182	32	Qualification for the UEFA Cup first round
3	Coleraine	22	13	5	4	42	27	1.556	31	
4	Linfield	22	11	5	6	43	25	1.720	27	
5	Bangor	22	9	7	6	28	27	1.037	25	
6	Ballymena United	22	8	5	9	36	35	1.029	21	
7	Ards	22	7	5	10	32	43	0.744	19	
8	Portadown	22	7	3	12	34	39	0.872	17	
9	Cliftonville	22	6	4	12	32	46	0.696	16	
10	Larne	22	6	3	13	32	45	0.711	15	
11	Glenavon	22	4	7	11	24	44	0.545	15	
12	Distillery	22	3	4	15	24	54	0.444	10	

Source: rsssf.com
(C) Champions

== Results ==
Home \ Away	ARD	BAN	BLM	CLI	COL	CRU	DIS	GLV	GLT	LRN	LIN	POR
Ards		1–2	1–1	4–3	3–1	0–3	1–2	2–2	0–3	3–1	1–3	2–4
Bangor	0–0		1–1	2–1	1–0	2–2	3–1	2–2	2–0	3–0	0–2	3–1
Ballymena United	0–1	4–1		1–0	5–1	2–3	1–0	4–1	1–2	3–2	1–1	1–1
Cliftonville	2–2	0–0	2–0		0–1	0–2	2–1	1–1	2–4	1–0	1–5	2–4
Coleraine	3–0	1–1	4–2	1–1		3–1	1–0	2–1	0–1	2–1	3–0	7–2
Crusaders	1–1	1–0	2–0	4–1	0–0		2–2	4–0	2–2	1–1	3–2	2–1
Distillery	0–2	1–1	1–3	5–2	2–3	0–7		1–1	0–5	1–2	0–1	2–0
Glenavon	1–3	0–1	1–1	0–3	0–1	1–5	3–1		1–1	4–1	0–5	2–1
Glentoran	2–3	3–0	5–2	4–1	2–2	0–1	3–0	2–0		1–1	2–1	1–0
Larne	3–0	2–3	0–1	1–4	1–2	0–2	5–3	3–2	2–1		2–4	0–1
Linfield	3–0	3–0	2–1	2–0	2–2	0–1	1–1	0–0	1–2	2–3		1–1
Portadown	3–2	1–0	3–1	2–3	1–2	1–2	5–0	0–1	0–2	1–1	1–2	

Source: Irish League Archive
Legend: Blue = home team win; Yellow = draw; Red = away team win.
