= Des Dickson (footballer, born 1948) =

Northern Irish footballer (born 1948)

Personal information
- Full name: Desmond Dickson
- Date of birth: 1948 (age 77–78)
- Place of birth: Ballymoney, Northern Ireland
- Position: Inside forward

Youth career
- Ballymoney Young Men

Senior career*
| Years | Team | Apps | (Gls) |
| 1967–1983 | Coleraine | 271 | (219) |

International career
| 1969–1970 | Northern Ireland Amateurs | 1 | (2) |
| 1970–1973 | Northern Ireland | 4 | (0) |
| 1978 | Irish League XI | 1 | (0) |

Managerial career
- 1981–1983: Coleraine (player-manager)
- * Club domestic league appearances and goals

Desmond Dickson (born 1948) is a Northern Irish retired footballer who played as an inside forward in the Irish League for Coleraine. He scored prolifically for the club, with 452 goals in 609 appearances, making him Coleraine's all-time leading scorer. In the 1969–70 season he scored 55 goals, winning both the Football Writers' Player of the Year award and the Golden Boot. In the 1970–71 Fairs Cup, Dickson scored a hat-trick in the second leg against Kilmarnock in Scotland, helping Coleraine to a 3–2 away victory after a 1–1 draw in the first leg. Dickson also managed the club.

== Honours ==
Coleraine

- Irish League: 1973–74
- Irish Cup: 1971–72, 1974–75, 1976–77
- Top Four Cup: 1968–69
- City Cup: 1968–69
- Gold Cup: 1969, 1975
- Ulster Cup: 1968–69, 1969–70, 1972–73, 1975–76
- Blaxnit Cup: 1968–69, 1969–70
- North West Senior Cup: 1967–68, 1980–81

Individual

- Irish League top goalscorer: 1969–70, 1971–72 (shared), 1972–73, 1973–74, 1975–76, 1980–81 (shared)
- Northern Ireland Football Writers' Association Player of the Year: 1969–70

== See also ==
- List of men's footballers with 500 or more goals
