= 1972–73 Irish League =

Irish League
- Season: 1972–73
- Champions: Crusaders; 1st Irish title
- Matches played: 132
- Goals scored: 446 (3.38 per match)
- Top goalscorer: Des Dickson (23 goals)

Location of teams in the Irish League from 1972–75
Location of Belfast-based teams in the Irish League from 1972–75

The 1972–73 Irish League was the 72nd edition of the Irish League, the highest level of league competition in Northern Irish football. The league consisted of 12 teams, and Crusaders won the championship.

== League standings ==
Pos	Team	Pld	W	D	L	GF	GA	GR	Pts	Qualification
1	Crusaders (C)	22	14	4	4	50	22	2.273	32	Qualification for the European Cup first round
2	Ards	22	13	5	4	49	22	2.227	31	Qualification for the UEFA Cup first round
3	Portadown	22	12	5	5	37	27	1.370	29	
4	Coleraine	22	13	2	7	51	31	1.645	28	
5	Linfield	22	12	3	7	38	29	1.310	27	
6	Glenavon	22	10	3	9	33	28	1.179	23	
7	Distillery	22	9	4	9	40	47	0.851	22	
8	Glentoran	22	9	3	10	48	40	1.200	21	Qualification for the European Cup Winners' Cup first round
9	Ballymena United	22	7	5	10	26	35	0.743	19	
10	Bangor	22	5	8	9	28	32	0.875	18	
11	Cliftonville	22	3	1	18	18	66	0.273	7	
12	Larne	22	2	3	17	28	67	0.418	7	

Source: rsssf.com
(C) Champions

== Results ==
Home \ Away	ARD	BAN	BLM	CLI	COL	CRU	DIS	GLV	GLT	LRN	LIN	POR
Ards		3–1	3–1	7–0	1–1	5–2	1–1	1–3	2–3	2–0	1–1	4–0
Bangor	1–1		1–0	1–0	1–2	1–1	2–5	1–1	2–3	6–0	0–1	1–3
Ballymena United	0–2	1–0		2–1	2–4	1–1	2–1	1–1	4–1	2–2	0–0	3–1
Cliftonville	0–4	1–1	1–0		0–5	0–1	2–3	3–1	0–5	1–3	1–2	1–5
Coleraine	0–1	0–0	2–1	1–0		0–3	4–0	4–0	4–1	6–1	4–2	1–3
Crusaders	2–1	2–0	3–0	3–0	2–1		1–0	2–0	2–0	6–1	2–0	1–1
Distillery	0–2	2–4	1–2	4–2	4–1	0–8		1–0	4–2	1–0	2–2	1–1
Glenavon	1–2	0–0	4–1	3–0	0–3	1–0	2–0		4–0	4–1	2–0	2–0
Glentoran	0–1	3–0	0–1	9–0	1–3	2–2	3–3	4–0		3–2	0–2	1–1
Larne	0–2	1–1	2–2	2–3	2–4	2–5	3–2	2–4	1–5		0–2	2–3
Linfield	4–2	1–3	2–0	2–1	3–1	5–1	2–3	1–0	0–1	2–1		3–1
Portadown	1–1	1–1	2–0	2–1	3–0	1–0	1–2	1–0	2–1	1–0	3–1	

Source: Irish League Archive
Legend: Blue = home team win; Yellow = draw; Red = away team win.
