= Curry Mulholland =

Northern Irish footballer

Curry Mulholland (died 2002) was a Northern Irish footballer, and former leading goalscorer for Crusaders F.C. with 149 goals, a record that stood for almost 40 years, until Glenn Hunter passed it in 1997. In 2003, in honour of his contribution to Crusaders, the Curry Mulholland Memorial Trophy was introduced, and is awarded annually to the top scorer in the U16 squad.

Curry was nominated and admitted to Crusaders' Hall of fame on 22 September 2007.
