= 1964–65 County Antrim Shield =

Tournament details
- Country: Northern Ireland
- Teams: 12

Final positions
- Champions: Crusaders (2nd win)
- Runners-up: Larne

Tournament statistics
- Matches played: 14
- Goals scored: 49 (3.5 per match)

The 1964–65 County Antrim Shield was the 76th edition of the County Antrim Shield, a cup competition in Northern Irish football.

Crusaders won the tournament for the 2nd time, defeating Larne 6–0 in the final at The Oval.

== Results ==
=== First round ===
Team 1	Score	Team 2
Cliftonville	1–0	Brantwood
Crusaders	3–3	Carrick Rangers
Glentoran	3–1	RUC
Larne	2–1	Distillery
Ards	bye	
Ballymena United	bye	
Bangor	bye	
Linfield	bye	

==== Replay ====
Team 1	Score	Team 2
Crusaders	4–0	Carrick Rangers

=== Quarter-finals ===
Team 1	Score	Team 2
Ards	4–2	Cliftonville
Crusaders	1–0	Bangor
Larne	4–1	Glentoran
Linfield	1–2	Ballymena United

=== Semi-finals ===
Team 1	Score	Team 2
Crusaders	3–0	Ards
Larne	1–1	Ballymena United

==== Replay ====
Team 1	Score	Team 2
Larne	1–1	Ballymena United

==== Second replay ====
Team 1	Score	Team 2
Larne	2–1	Ballymena United

=== Final ===
12 May 1965

Crusaders	6–0	Larne
McNeill 23'; Herron 52'; Hale 53', 56'; Weatherup 63', 87'	Report

The Oval, Belfast
