= Kirk Hunter =

Northern Irish footballer (born 1965)

Personal information
- Full name: Kirk Hunter
- Date of birth: 2 October 1965 (age 61)
- Place of birth: Belfast, Northern Ireland
- Positions: Attacking midfielder; striker

Senior career*
Years	Team	Apps	(Gls)
1985–1998	Crusaders		
1998–2002	Carrick Rangers		
- * Club domestic league appearances and goals

Kirk Hunter (born 2 October 1965) is a retired Northern Irish footballer. While he played less due to injuries and suspension in the later stages of his career, he won two Irish League titles with Crusaders, and is one of the most decorated Crusaders players. Recently signed for Royal Oak FC in the Sheffield Imperial League.

== Club career ==
Hunter began his career with Crusaders initially as a striker, but also as a midfielder. With Crusaders he won several trophies, and was part of one of the club's most successful sides in history. One of the highlights of his early career was scoring a hat-trick against Glentoran in a Gold Cup semi final on 4 December 1985, a competition Crusaders went on to win.

Whilst being an effective player, Hunter was also notable for his fiery nature on the pitch, and was without a doubt one of the most aggressive players in the history of Irish League football. In just one of many infamous incidents on the football pitch Kirk was brought to court and sued for a career-ending tackle on ex-Larne player Paul Murnin in 1992. In another incident Hunter was sent-off for fighting without touching the ball against North Belfast rivals Cliftonville in 1998 after being on the pitch less than 60 seconds.

However, there were also occasions when his all-or-nothing approach proved inspirational for his team-mates, such as an Irish Cup quarter-final against Linfield on 9 March 1996. Nearing the end of his career, and with the score at 0-0, Hunter was brought on as a substitute and helped the Crues to a 2-0 victory, but was substituted after 30 minutes of being brought on by manager Roy Walker, due to a fear of him being sent off. Irate Linfield fans threw missiles such as beer cans at Hunter as he was being substituted.

Hunter was given a testimonial in 1997 against Rangers, which included players such as Paul Gascoigne, Ally McCoist, and Gennaro Gattuso (who made his Rangers debut in the match). After a spell with Carrick Rangers he retired from football.

Despite these controversies, Kirk is regarded as one of the greatest players in the history of Crusaders, and was inducted into the Hall of Fame in 2007.

== Honours ==
Crusaders

- Irish League: 1994–95, 1996–97
- Irish League Cup: 1996–97
- County Antrim Shield: 1991–92
- Gold Cup: 1985–86, 1995–96
- Ulster Cup: 1993–94
