= 2009–10 County Antrim Shield =

Tournament details
- Country: Northern Ireland
- Teams: 16

Final positions
- Champions: Crusaders (6th win)
- Runners-up: Linfield

Tournament statistics
- Matches played: 15
- Goals scored: 44 (2.93 per match)

The 2009–10 County Antrim Shield was the 121st edition of the County Antrim Shield, a cup competition in Northern Irish football.

Crusaders won the tournament for the 6th time, defeating Linfield 3–2 in the final.

== Results ==
=== First round ===
Team 1	Score	Team 2
Ards	0–1	Linfield
Ballymena United	4–0	Harland & Wolff Welders
Bangor	0–1	Larne
Cliftonville	4–0	PSNI
Crusaders	3–1	Carrick Rangers
Donegal Celtic	2–0	Ballyclare Comrades
Glentoran	4–0	Ballymoney United
Lisburn Distillery	3–1	Dundela

=== Quarter-finals ===
Team 1	Score	Team 2
Donegal Celtic	1–4	Ballymena United
Glentoran	1–2	Linfield
Larne	1–3	Crusaders
Lisburn Distillery	0–1	Cliftonville

=== Semi-finals ===
Team 1	Score	Team 2
Crusaders	1–0	Ballymena United
Linfield	1–0	Cliftonville

=== Final ===
20 January 2010

Linfield	2–3 (a.e.t.)	Crusaders
Burns 6'; Ervin 85' (pen.); Carvill (red card) 60'		Dickson 39'; Coates 89'; Owens 98'

Windsor Park, Belfast
Referee: Trevor Moutray (Dundonald)
