= 2022–23 County Antrim Shield =

Tournament details
- Country: Northern Ireland
- Teams: 16

Final positions
- Champions: Larne (3rd title)
- Runners-up: Linfield

Tournament statistics
- Matches played: 15
- Goals scored: 35 (2.33 per match)

The 2022–23 County Antrim Shield was the 134th edition of the County Antrim Shield, a cup competition in Northern Irish football.

Larne won the tournament for the 3rd time and 3rd consecutive season, defeating Linfield 4–3 on penalties after a 0–0 draw in the final.

== Results ==
=== First round ===
| Team 1 | Score | Team 2 |
|---|---|---|
| Ards | 4–2 | Queen's University |
| Bangor | 0–0 (4–5 p) | Cliftonville |
| Crusaders | 0–1 | Linfield |
| Dundela | 1–1 (4–3 p) | Ballyclare Comrades |
| Glentoran | 1–0 | Lisburn Distillery |
| Harland & Wolff Welders | 0–1 | Carrick Rangers |
| Larne | 2–0 | Knockbreda |
| Newington | 1–2 | Ballymena United |

=== Quarter-finals ===
| Team 1 | Score | Team 2 |
|---|---|---|
| Ards | 1–4 | Glentoran |
| Carrick Rangers | 1–4 | Dundela |
| Cliftonville | 1–1 (4–5 p) | Linfield |
| Larne | 1–0 | Ballymena United |

=== Semi-finals ===
| Team 1 | Score | Team 2 |
|---|---|---|
| Dundela | 0–3 | Larne |
| Linfield | 2–1 | Glentoran |

=== Final ===
17 January 2023

| Larne | 0–0 | Linfield |
|---|---|---|
| | Report | McClean (red card) 30' |
Penalties
| Cosgrove (penalty scored); Millar (penalty missed); O'Neill (penalty scored); Hughes (penalty scored); Randall (penalty scored) | 4–3 | (penalty scored) Shields; (penalty scored) McKee; (penalty missed) Clarke; (penalty missed) Newberry; (penalty scored) Johns |

Seaview, Belfast
