= Glenn Hunter (footballer) =

Northern Ireland footballer

Personal information
- Full name: Glenn Cyril Hunter
- Date of birth: 23 November 1967 (age 58)
- Place of birth: Lisburn, Northern Ireland
- Position: Forward

Youth career
- 1984–1987: Distillery

Senior career*
Years	Team	Apps	(Gls)
1987–1989	Distillery		
1989–1990	Crusaders		
1991–1993	Linfield		
1993–1998	Crusaders		
1998–2001	Ballymena United	94	(37)
2001–2004	Lisburn Distillery	2+	

Managerial career
- Lisburn Distillery Reserves
- * Club domestic league appearances and goals

Glenn Cyril Hunter (born 23 November 1967) is a former Crusaders footballer and held the club's goalscoring record with 157 goals in 296 appearances, breaking the record of Curry Mulholland, which had stood for almost 40 years before being surpassed by Jordan Owens in January 2016.

== Playing career ==
Glenn Hunter began his career with his hometown club Distillery at the age of 15 in December 1984 before making his first-team debut in September 1987.

Hunter would then spend six years between two spells at Crusaders. The first spell saw him play for the club between 1989 and 1990 as their top scorer before leaving to join Linfield until 1993. With Linfield, he won the double 1992–93.

He rejoined Crusaders in July 1993 and during his second spell with the club, he won two league championships, including scoring a memorable diving header in 1995 against Ballymena United, that clinched the first of these titles. He also won the double with Crusaders in 1994–95.

He then joined Ballymena United in 1997 and made his debut during the 3–0 loss against Omagh Town on 10 January 1998. He scored his first goal for the club during the 5–2 win against Coleraine on 13 January 1998.

Hunter rejoined Lisburn Distillery in July 2001 and he made a further two substitute appearances for the club during the 2003–04 season. On 29 December 2003, he retired after a knee injury sidelined him at the age of 36.

He scored around 350 goals in total in his footballing career.

== Managerial career ==
Later in his career, he started managing Lisburn Distillery's reserve team.

== Personal life ==
After retiring from football, Hunter became a firefighter. His wife is Carol Hunter.

== Honours ==
Linfield

- Irish League: 1992–93
- Irish League Cup: 1991–92
- Irish Cup: runner-up 1991–92
- Ulster Cup: 1992–93
- Floodlit Cup: runner-up 1991–92

Crusaders

- Irish League Championship: 1994–95, 1996–97; runner-up 1995–96
- Gold Cup: 1995–96; runner-up 1994–95
- Ulster Cup: 1993–94
- Irish League Cup: 1995–96
- County Antrim Shield: runner-up 1993–94, 1995–96

Ballymena United

- Irish News Cup: runners-up 1997–98

Individual

- Crusaders Hall of Fame: inducted 2007
