= Alan Dornan =

Northern Irish footballer and manager

Personal information
- Date of birth: 30 August 1962 (age 64)
- Place of birth: Belfast, Northern Ireland
- Height: 1.75 m (5 ft 9 in)
- Position: Defender

Youth career
- Civil Service

Senior career*
Years	Team	Apps	(Gls)
1981–1986	Ards	?	(?)
1986–1996	Linfield	243	(8)
1996–1998	Crusaders	57	(2)
1998–2000	Glenavon	66	(0)
2000–2003	Crusaders	74	(0)

International career
1991	Irish League XI	1	(0)

Managerial career
- 2002–2005: Crusaders
- * Club domestic league appearances and goals

Alan Dornan (born 30 August 1962) is a retired Northern Irish footballer and manager.

== Playing career ==
He played over 1000 games, for Ards, Linfield and Crusaders in a playing career which spanned from 1981 to 2003.

== Managerial career ==
He also had a short but unsuccessful spell in charge of the latter. He was the first ever Crusaders manager to be sacked.

== Honours ==
Linfield

- Irish League (5): 1985-86, 1986-87, 1988-89, 1992-93, 1993-94
- Irish Cup (2): 1993-94, 1994–95
- Irish League Cup (3): 1986-87, 1991–92, 1993–94
- County Antrim Shield (1): 1994-95
- Charity Shield (2): 1993-94 (shared), 1994–95
- Gold Cup (3): 1987-88, 1988–89, 1989–90
- Ulster Cup (1): 1992-93
- Floodlit Cup (1): 1993-94

Crusaders

- Irish League (1): 1996-97
- Irish League Cup (1): 1996-97

Glenavon

- Mid-Ulster Cup (1): 1998-99
