= Gary McCartney =

Northern Irish footballer

Gary McCartney (born 15 August 1960) is a Northern Irish retired footballer who played for Linfield and Crusaders during their successful 1990s period. He later went on to manage the Crues' during the 2000–01 season, before resigning from his post, citing lack of funds.
