= Glenn Dunlop =

Northern Irish footballer

Personal information
- Date of birth: 12 May 1968 (age 58)
- Place of birth: Belfast, Northern Ireland
- Position: Centre back

Youth career
- 1989–1991: Sirocco Works

Senior career*
Years	Team	Apps	(Gls)
1991–2000	Crusaders	360	(12)

International career
1995	Northern Ireland B	1	(0)
1995	Irish League XI	1	(0)
- * Club domestic league appearances and goals

Glenn Dunlop (born 12 May 1968) is a Northern Irish retired footballer who played over 300 games for Crusaders as a central defender.

Dunlop won two championships with Crusaders and has been considered one of the best players in the Northern Ireland Football League in the 1990s by contemporary players and the media.

Dunlop retired in 2000 after suffering an ankle injury. Dunlop now works as a minister of the church.

== Biography ==
After beginning his playing career at amateur level for Sirocco Works, he signed for Belfast side Crusaders in 1991.

In his first full season with Crusaders in 1991, Dunlop received his first of two career nominations for Guinness Sport's Writer's Player of the Year award at Seaview. The 1995–96 season culminated in a PFA Player's Player of the Year award, the last one to be awarded, with two more of these awards to come in the two following seasons.

The 1996–97 season saw him grab a Goal of the Season award scored in a 2–0 win over Bangor at Seaview. He picked up the ball deep in his own half at the left back position and after running the length of the pitch, rounding several Bangor players, including the goalkeeper, slotted the ball home into an empty net. Ex. Manchester United manager, Tommy Docherty made the selection. Dunlop also won Guinness Sport's Writer's Player of the Month selections.

Dunlop appeared in Crusaders' Champions League preliminary round loss to Dinamo Tbilisi in 1997.

Dunlop's contract expired after the championship-winning 1997 season with Linfield showing interest, but he ultimately re-signed with Crusaders. Dunlop was also linked with a move to Portadown in 1998.

Dunlop had a testimonial match against English Premiership side Derby County in July 2000. He injured his ankle against Newry and left the game in November 2000. He now works in the church.

== Honours ==
Crusaders

- Irish League (2): 1994/95, 1996/97
- Irish League Cup (1): 1996/97
- Gold Cup (1): 1995/96
- Ulster Cup (1): 1993/94

Individual

- Northern Ireland PFA Players Player of the Year (1): 1994/95
- Football Writers' Premier League Team of the Year (3): 1995/96, 1996/97, 1997/98
- Guinness Sport's Writer's Player of the Month (3)
