= 1995–96 Gold Cup =

Tournament details
- Country: Northern Ireland
- Teams: 16

Final positions
- Champions: Crusaders (2nd win)
- Runners-up: Linfield

Tournament statistics
- Matches played: 31
- Goals scored: 90 (2.9 per match)

The 1995–96 Gold Cup was the 77th edition of the Gold Cup, a cup competition in Northern Irish football.

The tournament was won by Crusaders for the 2nd time, defeating Linfield 1–0 in the final at The Oval.

== Group standings ==
=== Section A ===
Pos	Team	Pld	W	D	L	GF	GA	GD	Pts	Result
1	Crusaders	3	2	1	0	9	5	+4	7	Advance to quarter-final
2	Linfield	3	1	2	0	5	3	+2	5	Advance to quarter-final
3	Distillery	3	1	1	1	6	6	0	4	
4	Newry Town	3	0	0	3	3	9	−6	0	

Source: Irish League Archive

=== Section B ===
Pos	Team	Pld	W	D	L	GF	GA	GD	Pts	Result
1	Glenavon	3	3	0	0	7	1	+6	9	Advance to quarter-final
2	Bangor	3	2	0	1	4	2	+2	6	Advance to quarter-final
3	Ballymena United	3	1	0	2	2	4	−2	3	
4	Coleraine	3	0	0	3	2	8	−6	0	

Source: Irish League Archive

=== Section C ===
Pos	Team	Pld	W	D	L	GF	GA	GD	Pts	Result
1	Portadown	3	2	1	0	10	5	+5	7	Advance to quarter-final
2	Omagh Town	3	1	2	0	5	4	+1	5	Advance to quarter-final
3	Ards	3	1	1	1	8	9	−1	4	
4	Ballyclare Comrades	3	0	0	3	0	5	−5	0	

Source: Irish League Archive

=== Section D ===
Pos	Team	Pld	W	D	L	GF	GA	GD	Pts	Result
1	Cliftonville	3	2	0	1	5	1	+4	6	Advance to quarter-final
2	Glentoran	3	1	1	1	3	2	+1	4	Advance to quarter-final
3	Carrick Rangers	3	1	1	1	3	5	−2	4	
4	Larne	3	1	0	2	1	4	−3	3	

Source: Irish League Archive

== Quarter-finals ==
Team 1	Score	Team 2
Cliftonville	1–0	Ballymena United
Crusaders	2–1	Bangor
Linfield	2–2 (a.e.t.) (4–3 p)	Glentoran
Omagh Town	4–2	Portadown

== Semi-finals ==
Team 1	Score	Team 2
Crusaders	1–0	Omagh Town
Linfield	2–1	Cliftonville

== Final ==
13 February 1996

Crusaders	1–0	Linfield
O'Brien 10'

The Oval, Belfast
Referee: Alan Snoddy (Carryduff)
