= Crusaders F.C. =

Association football club in Northern Ireland

Crusaders
- Full name: Crusaders Football Club
- Nicknames: The Crues; The Hatchetmen
- Founded: 1898; 128 years ago
- Ground: Seaview
- Capacity: 3,383
- Chairman: Mark Langhammer
- Manager: Declan Caddell
- League: NIFL Premiership
- 2025–26: NIFL Premiership, 11th of 12
- Website: www.crusadersfc.com
Home colours	Away colours

Crusaders Football Club is a semi-professional Northern Irish football club playing in the NIFL Premiership. The club, founded in 1898, is based in north Belfast and plays its home matches at Seaview.

Crusaders originally played as a junior level team until 1931. They then played intermediate level football until 1949, and during that time they were one of the top non-senior teams in the country, winning the Irish Intermediate League nine times and the Steel & Sons Cup on seven occasions. After the withdrawal of Belfast Celtic, Crusaders were elected to the top level in their place, in time for the start of the 1949–50 season. Since then, the club has won 32 senior trophies; seven league titles, six Irish Cups, two League Cups, eight County Antrim Shields, one Setanta Sports Cup, two Charity Shields, two Gold Cups, three Ulster Cups and one Carlsberg Cup.

The club's traditional kit colours are red and black, and the current manager is Declan Caddell. The club's closest rivals are Cliftonville, with whom they contest the North Belfast derby. Rivalries also exist with other Belfast sides such as Linfield and Glentoran.

== History ==
=== Junior years (1898–1921) ===
Crusaders Football Club was formed in the year 1898, although the exact date is unknown. The first meeting of the club is believed to have been held at 182 North Queen Street, Belfast, the home of Thomas Palmer who, along with James McEldowney, John Hume and Thomas Wade, was a member of the original club committee.

Various names were suggested for the club, including 'Rowan Star', 'Cultra United', 'Mervue Wanderers', 'Moyola' (all names of local streets), and others such as 'Queen's Rovers', and the 'Lilliputians'. Thomas Palmer felt a name of more international significance should be adopted and he suggested "Crusaders", after the medieval Christian knights. The team is informally known as the Crues.

Initially, the club was only able to undertake friendly fixtures until it was formally admitted to one of the local junior leagues. Players were compelled to pay a match fee of two pence before they could take the field; a strict "no pay, no play" club policy was enforced. The very first competitive game of which there is any existing written record was on 10 December 1898. It came in the North Belfast Alliance against opponents named Bedford at Alexandra Park and the report states that, "after a splendid game Crusaders won by 5 to 2."

Crusaders went on to compete in the Dunville Alliance, Ormeau Junior Alliance, Alexandra Alliance, Woodvale Alliance and Irish Football Alliance (the latter of which they won three years in a row from 1916 to 1918) until their election to the Irish Intermediate League in 1921.

=== Intermediate years (1921–1949) ===
Crusaders rapidly became one of the top intermediate sides in the country, and won an impressive collection of trophies, including the Intermediate League championship six times in ten years from 1923 to 1933. In addition, the side were very successful in the top junior cup competition, the Steel & Sons Cup, winning the competition on seven occasions as a junior side (the first team would win the same cup again many years later in 2005, after relegation to intermediate football).

The side also reached the Irish Cup semi finals three times in the 1920s. The first came in the 1923–24 season, where they were defeated by that season's Irish League champions Queen's Island in a replay at Pirrie Park. In the 1924–25 season the Crues knocked out senior sides Larne and Belfast Celtic before being halted by Glentoran at The Oval in the semi-finals (who also went on to be champions that year). They reached the semi-finals once again in 1927, losing 2–4 at home to derby rivals Cliftonville. The Crues also reached the final of the Belfast Charities Cup in 1923 (losing to Glentoran), also an impressive achievement as the competition was open to all senior clubs in Belfast and the surrounding area.

Despite these feats, repeated applications for entry to the senior Irish League were turned down. The frustration at the club was such that serious consideration was given to making membership applications either to the Scottish Football League or to the League of Ireland. However, the Second World War intervened and no football at all was played by the Crues between April 1941 and September 1945. Crusaders began competing once more in the Intermediate League after the war, beginning with the 1945–46 season.

=== Early Irish League years (1949–1960) ===
Crusaders won the 1948–49 Intermediate League with a record number of points, and coupled with the vacancy created by the dramatic withdrawal of Belfast Celtic from the senior ranks in 1949, Crusaders were finally elected to the senior Irish League in time for the start of the 1949–50 season. Their first competitive game as a senior club was on 20 August 1949 and resulted in a 1–0 City Cup win at Portadown – ex-Belfast Celtic striker Vincent Morrison, signed during that summer, had the honour of scoring the club's first ever goal as a senior club. Morrison was the club's top scorer of their first senior season with 11 goals in all competitions. The Crues' first league match took place on 26 November, a 1–4 defeat to Linfield at Windsor Park, and their first victory came on 10 December away to Ballymena United by 3–1, but the side would have to wait until 1 April 1950 for the first league win at Seaview, with a 4–1 victory over Glenavon. The season was tough going for the 'Hatchetmen', as they were also known, and they had to apply for re-election after finishing in 11th place out of 12 clubs.

As has always been the case, however, Crusaders never lacked determination. On 17 May 1952 they participated in their first senior final, the Festival of Britain Cup final, which they lost 0–3 to Ballymena United. Under the player-managership of Jackie Vernon they recovered to win their first senior trophy in the 1953–54 season by defeating Linfield 2–1 in the final of the Ulster Cup. The 1950s were not easy in spite of the presence in the side of some excellent individuals and the end of the 1957–58 season saw another application for re-election. The decade also saw the emergence of Curry Mulholland, who represented the club from 1951 until 1960, setting a goalscoring record of 149 which would not be beaten until the 1990s.

=== Irish Cup wins and European forays (1960–1970) ===
The 1960s brought much more success. On 17 May 1960 they won the County Antrim Shield for the first time, repeating the feat in 1965 with a 6–0 victory over Larne (this was the joint-biggest margin of victory in the final of the competition until Linfields 9–1 victory over Bangor in 1973). With Jimmy Murdough as coach they also picked up another Ulster Cup final win on 1 October 1963, with a reply victory of 1–0 over Glenavon. These successes were overshadowed by two unexpected victories in the Irish Cup finals of 1967 and 1968 against the might of Glentoran and Linfield respectively. This led to Crusaders' first sojourn into European competition, against Valencia CF in August 1967. Also in 1968, they narrowly missed out on winning the Blaxnit Cup and becoming champions of all of Ireland, losing 3–4 on aggregate to Shamrock Rovers. The 1960s also saw the emergence of some of the greatest players in Crusaders' history, such as Albert Campbell, (who was the club's most capped international player until surpassed by Colin Coates), Danny Trainor, Joe Meldrum, Walter McFarland and Danny Hale, who scored an incredible 143 goals in just four seasons, including a club record of 55 goals in the 1965–66 season, which still stands to this day.

=== Billy Johnston era (1971–1979) ===
Jimmy Todd had won the second of those Irish Cups with the side in 1968, however by the early 1970s the Crues had declined slightly as the side of the 1960s broke up. Todd was replaced with Billy Johnston in early 1971, and he set about restructuring the squad. Under Johnston unprecedented success was to follow, with the Irish League championship trophy finding a home at Seaview in 1972–73, with the attacking duo of Tommy Finney and Jackie Fullerton scoring 47 goals between them. The club also set a record of going through the whole league campaign unbeaten at home, a feat which was repeated 40 years later in the 2012–13 season. This led to the club's first ever participation in the European Cup, in which they faced Dinamo Bucharest and had the misfortune of setting the record for a defeat in that competition, losing 0–11 in the away leg on 3 October 1973.

In the 1975–76 season the Crues won the league for the second time, largely aided by the goalscoring of Ronnie McAteer who scored 20 league goals in 22 games. Sandwiched in between these successes was a County Antrim Shield and Carlsberg Cup success in 1973–74.

The second championship triumph resulted in the never-to-be-forgotten European Cup-tie with Liverpool which saw the brave Cruemen fall to the might of Kevin Keegan and John Toshack among others at Anfield by just 0–2 through a Phil Neal penalty and a Toshack strike. The home leg which followed was played before a crowd hanging from the rafters that would undoubtedly give the current health and safety legislators a heart attack. The Crues put up a dogged performance – Keegan scored in the 34th minute, and the Crues battled until the final ten minutes, when Liverpool's superior fitness told with four goals coming in the final ten minutes through David Johnson (2), Terry McDermott, and Steve Heighway.

However the 1970s also saw The Troubles begin to affect Irish League football, with two incidents in particular affecting the football club. On 21 August 1979 there were more than 1,900 police officers on duty for a match between Crusaders and Cliftonville, more than has ever been recorded at a football match in the United Kingdom. Another black day shadowed the club on 12 January 1980, when RUC constable David Purse was shot dead by an IRA gunman during a match with Portadown – the only murder at a football ground during the Troubles.

=== The Eighties (1980–1989) ===
Johnston had left the club in 1977, and after a two-year spell of management by ex-player Norman Pavis, Ian Russell took charge of the club in 1979. While there was great promise shown initially during Russell's spell, with the club reaching both the County Antrim Shield and Irish Cup final in 1980, they did not build on this and Russell left in 1983.

Although performances on the pitch in the 1980s were steady, they certainly were not spectacular and the club paid the penalty for not building on earlier successes. Tommy Jackson took over in 1983, and led the Crues to their sole cup triumph during the decade, with the club winning the Gold Cup for the first time in the 1985–86 season.

Jackson left in 1986 and new manager Jackie Hutton had no money with which to buy players but he did the club a great service when he somehow completed the deal which brought Roy Walker, initially as a player, to Seaview in 1988.

=== Roy Walker era (1989–1998) ===
Hutton was quick to recognise the leadership qualities in Walker and saw him as his potential successor. Walker took over as player-manager in September 1989, two years after his arrival as a player. One of his first tasks was to apply for re-election as the Crues finished 13th out of 14 clubs. Notable players to begin their association with the club during this era were the likes of Sid Burrows, Glenn Hunter and Kirk Hunter.

At the same time, local businessman Harry Corry, pumped some desperately needed sponsorship money into the club. As the revival began, southern businessman Tony O'Connell also became involved.

Walker's sides – he dubbed them "the team with no boots" – went on to win nearly everything in sight whilst wealthier and bigger-supported clubs could only watch and wonder. There were two further championship titles won (1995 and 1997) whilst Crusaders also finished runners-up in 1993 (losing the title on goal difference) and 1996. Other trophies won were the County Antrim Shield (1992), Ulster Cup (1993) and Gold Cup (1996).

In turn, this meant more expeditions into Europe as the Crues took on teams from Switzerland, Denmark, Lithuania and Georgia within a five-year span. The team of the 1990s is regarded as one of the best in the history of the club, with a large part of the success revolving around the core of Kevin McKeown, Glenn Dunlop, Martin Murray, Sid Burrows, and the attacking duo of Glenn Hunter (who would go on to set a club goalscoring record of 157 goals) and Stephen Baxter.

The team was affectionately known as the "God Squad", due to the large number of Christians in the playing squad and staff. In addition to the first team and the reserves, teams at under-16 and under-18 level were introduced for the first time as the club looked to nurture and develop local talent in the area. Roy Walker suddenly resigned as manager in May 1998, just prior to the club's centenary dinner celebrations at Belfast City Hall. He was the longest-serving manager in the club's history until surpassed by Stephen Baxter in October 2013.

=== Gradual decline (1998–2005) ===
Subsequently, a lack of funds saw the Seaview fortunes decline as the decade came to a close, with Dublin-based player-managers Aaron Callaghan and Martin Murray both resigning after one year apiece in charge. Callaghan managed to lead the club to third place in his sole season in charge, but it would be many years before the Crues would challenge at such a high level again. Former player Gary McCartney took over the managerial reins in July 2000. The team narrowly retained Premier Division status after a nail-biting play-off success over Lisburn Distillery thanks to a hat-trick from veteran Stephen Baxter in May 2001 but McCartney resigned just over twelve months later because of the limited budget at his disposal.

Popular veteran defender Alan Dornan was appointed as McCartney's successor at the end of June 2002 and the side retained Premier Division status that season under his guidance, although the squad was very inexperienced and often included six or seven teenagers. The emphasis on youth continued in 2003–04 as the Crues achieved a mid-table finish, an improvement compared to preceding seasons.

Dornan's next season in charge was not as successful. He was sacked just after midway through the season, as the Crues lay at the bottom of the table, despite having guided the team to the County Antrim Shield final, which they lost to Linfield. Dornan was the first ever Crusaders manager to be sacked. Former striker and fans' favourite Stephen Baxter was appointed as manager but despite an improvement in results, he could not keep the club in the Premier League, with the Crues losing out to Glenavon in a relegation play-off, the first ever Premier League team to lose to a First Division side in the play-offs. The relegation was the first time Crusaders had ever been relegated from any league, and meant an end to 56 consecutive seasons of senior football.

=== Stephen Baxter era (2005–2024) ===
They immediately bounced back the following year under Baxter by winning the IFA Intermediate League, the Intermediate League Cup, and Steel & Sons Cup. After their first season back in the top flight after promotion, the Hatchetmen finished in a creditable 6th place, after briefly topping the table at the beginning of the season.

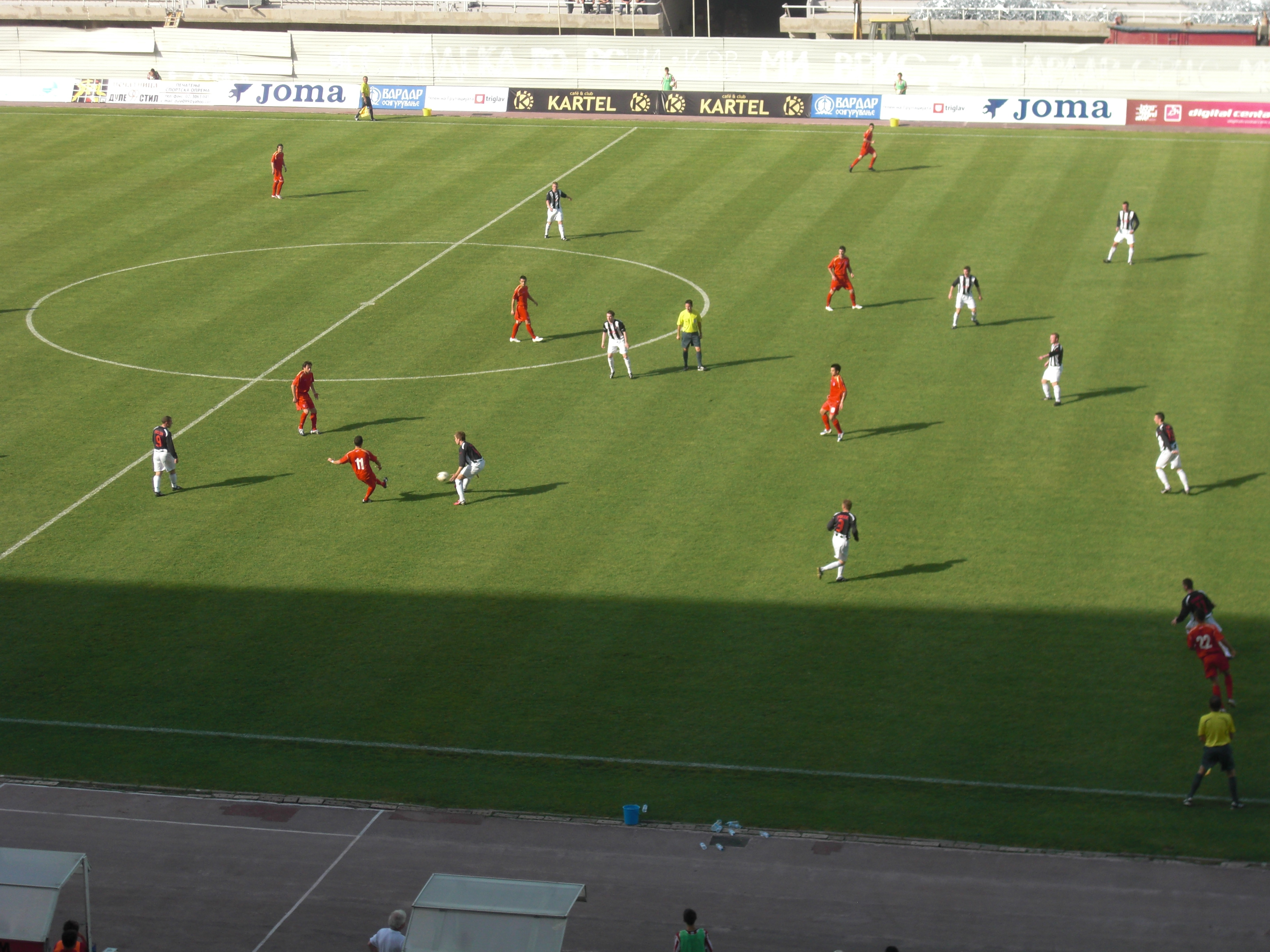
2009–10 UEFA Europa League qualifying match between FK Rabotnički and Crusaders F.C. at Philip II Arena in Skopje

In the 2007–08 season, the Crues finished in 7th position in the League after a somewhat inconsistent start to the season. They appeared in two finals, losing both the County Antrim Shield 1–2 to Glentoran, and the Irish League Cup, 2–3 to Linfield.

During 2008–09 season, they finished in the top three of the League for the first time in 10 years. The club also won their first Irish Cup final since 1968, thanks to a Mark Dickson goal, in a 1–0 victory over Cliftonville at Windsor Park on 9 May 2009. The same season, Crusaders began a partnership with fellow North Belfast club Newington in a cross-community initiative, which saw Newington play their home matches at Seaview. This became their permanent venue for home matches in 2011.

As a result, Crusaders entered Europe for the first time in 12 years and faced Macedonian side FK Rabotnički in the Europa League second qualifying round. The game was drawn 1–1 with David Rainey scoring on the 89th minute. On 23 July 2009 in their second leg encounter with FK Rabotnicki in Macedonia they lost the game 4–2 and exited the competition 5–3 on aggregate.

In a move endorsed by UEFA President Michel Platini, the club changed from a grass pitch to a 4G-synthetic pitch. The artificial football turf pitch was manufactured by Act Global. They played their first game on the new pitch against Glentoran on 14 November 2009. This move has turned out to be fruitful for the club, with matches at Seaview being the only games in Northern Ireland to survive the weather over the Christmas period. The same season the side won their second major trophy in a year, picking up the County Antrim Shield after a 3–2 extra time victory over Linfield.

In the 2010–11 season Crusaders challenged Linfield for the league title, after being 13 points behind at one stage. They ended up as runners up. The Crues also reached final of the Irish Cup where they played Linfield at Windsor Park. Crusaders went 1–0 up through Declan Caddell, but goals from Peter Thompson and Mark McAllister condemned the Crues to defeat.

The Crues then entered the 2011–12 UEFA Europa League and received their biggest draw since the famous game against Liverpool 35 years before, as the side drew Premier League team Fulham in the second qualifying round. In the home tie the side put up a brave fight, with new signing Timmy Adamson scoring an equalising goal and striking the bar with the score poised at 1–1, before eventually succumbing 1–3. In the second leg, the Premier League side proved too strong for the Hatchetmen, as they dominated the game and won 4–0.

At the same time, Seaview underwent extensive renovation, with two new stands and new seating installed, making the ground all-seater and one of the most modern sports stadiums in Northern Ireland. That same season they won the Irish League Cup, defeating Coleraine 1–0 at the Ballymena Showgrounds thanks to a Chris Morrow strike. Crusaders also became champions of Ireland for the first time, after defeating Derry City in the 2012 Setanta Cup Final 5–4 in a penalty shootout after a 2–2 draw after extra time. Captain Colin Coates scored both goals during the match, with Coates, Chris Morrow, Matthew Snoddy, Stuart Dallas and Gareth McKeown successfully converting their penalties.

Crusaders played Cliftonville on 26 January 2013 in the Irish League Cup final at Windsor Park losing 0–4 – a joint-record defeat in the competition's final. The following season, the same two teams reached the final, playing out a drab 0–0 draw at Solitude, with Cliftonville retaining the trophy by winning 3–2 on penalties.

The 2014–15 season was a groundbreaking one for Crusaders. The season started with the side earning their first win in European competition for 18 years, defeating FK Ekranas of Lithuania in the UEFA Europa League 3–1 at home. In the return leg, Crusaders earned their first ever away victory in Europe, winning 2–1 thanks to two goals from Paul Heatley, and earning their first aggregate victory in Europe. In the second qualifying round, Crusaders bowed out against Swedish side IF Brommapojkarna after a 1–4 aggregate defeat. In cup competition, Crusaders reached the quarter-final of the Northern Ireland Football League Cup and the semi-final of the County Antrim Shield, losing both ties to Bangor, and the semi-final of the Irish Cup, losing out to Glentoran. Despite this, the side saved their best performances for the league, going unbeaten from December to April and winning 12 of 13 games. A 1–0 derby victory away to Cliftonville thanks to a Paul Heatley goal all but sealed the title, with a 2–0 home win the following week against Glentoran with goals from Declan Caddell and yet another from Heatley confirming the Gibson Cup's place at Seaview.

In the 2015–16 season, Crusaders retained the league title for the first time in their history, after a 3–1 victory over Cliftonville at Solitude on 19 April 2016. In the following season they narrowly missed out on winning the Gibson Cup for the 3rd time in a row, finishing 2nd to Linfield after a dramatic dip in Crusaders' form late in the season, with a 1–0 defeat to David Healy's side at Windsor Park on 8 April 2017 proving to be the match that decided the league title. The 2016–17 season was the first since 2013–14 that Crusaders failed to win any silverware.

However, the Hatchetmen bounced back in the 2017–18 season, regaining the Gibson Cup in a title race that went to the final day of the season. In the end, it was a 2–1 victory at the Ballymena Showgrounds on 28 April 2018 that brought the league title back to Seaview for the 3rd time in 4 years, thanks to goals from Philip Lowry and David Cushley, after Cathair Friel opened the scoring for Ballymena United and threatened to send the title to eventual runners-up Coleraine. Crusaders also won the County Antrim Shield at the Ballymena Showgrounds after a 4–2 victory over Ballymena United on 23 January 2018. Crusaders finished the season having scored an incredible 106 league goals, with over half of this tally coming from the attacking trio of Paul Heatley, Gavin Whyte and Jordan Owens.

In the first qualifying round of the 2018–19 Champions League, Crusaders received their biggest European draw since facing Fulham 7 years earlier, being drawn against European group stage regulars and Bulgarian champions Ludogorets Razgrad. However, the tie turned out to be no contest as the Crues were thrashed 7–0 at the Ludogorets Arena, with goals from Marcelinho, Claudiu Keșerü and a 7-minute hat-trick from substitute Jakub Swierczok. The return leg at Seaview then ended 2–0 to the Bulgarian visitors, thanks to a strike from Swierczok and an own goal from left-back Rodney Brown. After an uneventful league campaign, the Crues completed a cup double by winning the County Antrim Shield with a 4–3 victory over Linfield, and the Irish Cup with a 3–0 victory over Ballinamallard United.

In the 2019–20 UEFA Europa League, Crusaders beat B36 Tórshavn 5–2 on aggregate to reach the second qualifying round, where they faced English Premier League side Wolverhampton Wanderers. In the first leg at Molineux the Crues lost 2–0, before losing 4–1 at Seaview in the second leg.

In March 2022 Crusaders members voted 236–36 at an EGM in favour of accepting investment by the IRAMA company, who were seeking to buy a majority stake in the club. This deal later fell through over tax issues. In May 2022, the club reached the final of the 2021–22 Irish Cup. Trailing 1–0 for most of the match, Josh Robinson equalised in the last minute of the game to force extra time, and with penalty kicks approaching at the end of extra time, substitute Johnny McMurray scored the winning goal with virtually the last kick of the game to seal an extraordinary victory. In May 2023, Crusaders won the Irish cup for a second time in a row, once again beating Ballymena United, this time 4–0.

During the 2023–24 season, Baxter announced he would be stepping down as manager of the club, after 19 seasons in charge, at the end of the campaign. In Baxter's last domestic match, Crusaders defeated Coleraine 3–2 in the UEFA Conference League playoff final, to qualify for continental competition for the 12th time in 13 seasons.

=== Declan Caddell (2024–) ===
Former player and head of Crusaders academy Declan Caddell was announced as Baxter's successor in March 2024, and took charge for the 2024–25 season.

== Stadium ==
The team played at a variety of venues before settling at Seaview in 1921, which is still their home to this day. Earlier home venues included the Glen (which later became part of Alexandra Park), Simpson's Boiler Fields on the Cavehill Road, the Shore Road (opposite the Grove Leisure Centre) and Rokeby Park. Seaview was officially opened on 3 September 1921 by William Grant MP, prior to kick-off in a 3–1 Intermediate League fixture victory against Cliftonville Olympic.

In July 1966 the original social club, dressing rooms and administration areas were destroyed by fire. They were replaced in 1970 by the present bigger and better facilities. Lisburn Distillery (known as Distillery prior to 1999) shared Seaview with Crusaders from 1971 until 1979, after their original Grosvenor Park home was destroyed in an arson attack. Since 1972, Seaview has been the venue for the Steel & Sons Cup Final, which is traditionally held on Christmas Day (unless the game falls on a Sunday). Only two finals have not been played at Seaview since then, the 1975 final and the 1984 final replay (both of which were played at Solitude).

In 2009, Crusaders became the first team in the Irish League to install a 4G artificial pitch, endorsed by UEFA. The move has ensured that postponements due to bad weather have not affected Seaview as much as some other grounds. Other clubs have since followed suit, with Cliftonville installing a 3G artificial pitch the following year and Bangor in 2013.

In 2010, after European funding was declined, funding was secured from a private investor for the club to move to a new stadium in the Duncrue area of Belfast, near the docks (about 3/4 miles from Seaview) within "5 or 6 years". However, with a stadium move subsequently shelved, the club submitted plans to redevelop the current stadium, and had planning permission approved in 2015.

== Support ==
Crusaders has traditionally drawn its support from the people of north Belfast, Newtownabbey, and the south and east of County Antrim. From these members it elects its committee and its particular ethos, with a strong emphasis on community relations. An example of this is their local connection with Seaview Primary School, who have a long-established connection with the club through fundraisers and charity events, as well as school fetes.

However, the club's serious financial plight became very apparent in the early 2000s and in 2002 consideration was given to changing the structure from one of a membership-based organisation to that of a public limited company. Members voted at the AGM against such a change in May 2002. In 2009, club members voted to become a company limited by guarantee.

Crusaders attract a loyal support and had the fourth-highest average attendance in Northern Ireland for the 2014–15 season, with an average of 1,275. In the 2015–16 season, their average attendance was the second-highest in the league after Linfield.

=== Average attendance ===
Season	Average
2008–09	795
2009–10	1,114
2010–11	819
2011–12	923
2012–13	853
2013–14	908
2014–15	1,275
2015–16	1,562
2016–17	1,513
2017–18	1,494
2018–19	1,394
2019–20	1,347
2020–21	369 (Note: Attendances were curtailed during the 2020–21 NIFL Premiership season due to the COVID-19 pandemic.)
2021–22	1,536
2022–23	1,607
2023–24	1,634

=== Rivalry ===
Crusaders biggest rivals are Cliftonville, with whom they contest the North Belfast derby. Crusaders traditionally dominated the rivalry (not failing to score in home league matches against the Reds from 1949 until 1998) mainly due to Cliftonville's amateur status; since the mid-1970s the derby has been much more competitive. Crusaders have won 153 games to Cliftonville's 85, and since competing at the same level have won 28 senior honours to Cliftonville's 19. The sides have contested four cup finals together, with Cliftonville winning the 1979 County Antrim Shield final, the 2013 and 2014 League Cup finals, and Crusaders winning the 2009 Irish Cup final.

Historically, Crusaders shared a rivalry with Brantwood (who play in Skegoneill Avenue about 500 yards away from Seaview) when both sides were junior teams. With Crusaders' election to the Irish League in 1949, the intense rivalry gradually faded away. Crusaders also share city rivalries with other Belfast clubs Linfield and Glentoran.

== League and cup history ==
=== Recent seasons ===
Season	League								Irish Cup	League Cup	County Antrim Shield	NIFL Charity Shield	Scottish Challenge Cup	Setanta Sports Cup	Europe		Notes
Season	Pos.	P	W	D	L	GF	GA	Pts.	Result	Result	Result	Result	Result	Result	Competition	Result	Notes
2008–09	3rd	38	16	14	8	63	45	62	W	Last 16	SF	–	–	–	did not qualify	–	–
2009–10	4th	38	17	9	12	57	52	60	QF	Last 16	W	–	–	–	UEFA Europa League	2QR	–
2010–11	2nd	38	23	5	10	78	59	74	RU	SF	SF	–	–	QF	did not qualify	–	–
2011–12	5th	38	18	10	10	63	47	64	RU	W	QF	–	–	W	UEFA Europa League	2QR	–
2012–13	2nd	38	26	5	7	82	41	83	SF	RU	SF	–	–	QF	UEFA Europa League	1QR	–
2013–14	3rd	38	18	12	8	67	42	66	SF	RU	RU	–	–	QF	UEFA Europa League	1QR	–
2014–15	1st	38	25	7	6	93	43	82	SF	QF	SF	–	–	–	UEFA Europa League	2QR	–
2015–16	1st	38	28	7	3	79	28	91	SF	Last 16	QF	RU	–	–	UEFA Champions League	2QR	–
2016–17	2nd	38	27	6	5	83	36	87	QF	QF	RU	RU	Last 16	–	UEFA Champions League	2QR	–
2017–18	1st	38	28	7	3	106	38	91	Last 16	SF	W	–	SF	–	UEFA Europa League	1QR	–
2018–19	4th	38	20	5	13	68	55	65	W	SF	W	–	Last 32	–	UEFA Champions League; UEFA Europa League	1QR; 2QR	–
2019–20	3rd	31	17	8	6	66	30	59	QF	RU	QF	–	–	–	UEFA Europa League	2QR	^{[A]}
2020–21	6th	38	16	6	16	62	50	54	SF	–	QF	–	–	–	did not qualify	–	^{[B]}
2021–22	4th	38	21	5	12	60	36	68	W	Last 16	QF	–	–	–	did not qualify	–	–
2022–23	5th	38	19	10	9	72	45	67	W	Last 32	Last 16	W	–	–	UEFA Europa Conference League	2QR	–
2023–24	4th	38	19	7	12	61	43	64	Last 32	Last 16	Last 16	W	–	–	UEFA Europa Conference League	2QR	–

A. League was curtailed after 31 games and awarded on points per game average as a result of the COVID-19 pandemic in Northern Ireland.
B. League Cup competition was not held as a result of the COVID-19 pandemic in Northern Ireland.

== European record ==
Fully up to date as of 3 August 2023

=== Overview ===
Competition	Matches	W	D	L	GF	GA
European Cup / UEFA Champions League	14	1	2	11	7	52
UEFA Cup / UEFA Europa League	26	6	4	16	27	62
UEFA Europa Conference League	8	2	3	3	12	13
European Cup Winners' Cup	6	0	2	4	5	18
TOTAL	54	9	11	34	51	145

=== Matches ===
Season	Competition	Round	Opponent	Home	Away	Aggregate
1967–68	European Cup Winners' Cup	1R	(Spain) Valencia	2–4	0–4	2–8
1968–69	European Cup Winners' Cup	1R	(Sweden) Norrköping	2–2	1–4	3–6
1973–74	European Cup	1R	(Romania) Dinamo Bucharest	0–1	0–11	0–12
1976–77	European Cup	1R	(England) Liverpool	0–5	0–2	0–7
1980–81	European Cup Winners' Cup	1R	(Wales) Newport County	0–0	0–4	0–4
1993–94	UEFA Cup	1R	(Switzerland) Servette	0–0	0–4	0–4
1995–96	UEFA Cup	PR	(Denmark) Silkeborg	1–2	0–4	1–6
1996–97	UEFA Cup	PR	(Lithuania) Žalgiris Vilnius	2–1	0–2	2–3
1997–98	UEFA Champions League	1QR	(Georgia (country)) Dinamo Tbilisi	1–3	1–5	2–8
2009–10	UEFA Europa League	2QR	(North Macedonia) Rabotnički	1–1	2–4	3–5
2011–12	UEFA Europa League	2QR	(England) Fulham	1–3	0–4	1–7
2012–13	UEFA Europa League	1QR	(Norway) Rosenborg	0–3	0–1	0–4
2013–14	UEFA Europa League	1QR	(Norway) Rosenborg	1–2	2–7	3–9
2014–15	UEFA Europa League	1QR	(Lithuania) Ekranas	3–1	2–1	5–2
2014–15	UEFA Europa League	2QR	(Sweden) Brommapojkarna	1–1	0–4	1–5
2015–16	UEFA Champions League	1QR	(Estonia) Levadia Tallinn	0–0	1–1	1–1 (a)
2015–16	UEFA Champions League	2QR	(Albania) Skënderbeu	3–2	1–4	4–6
2016–17	UEFA Champions League	2QR	(Denmark) København	0–3	0–6	0–9
2017–18	UEFA Europa League	1QR	(Latvia) Liepāja	3–1	0–2	3–3 (a)
2018–19	UEFA Champions League	1QR	(Bulgaria) Ludogorets Razgrad	0–2	0–7	0–9
2018–19	UEFA Europa League	2QR	(Slovenia) Olimpija Ljubljana	1–5	1–1	2–6
2019–20	UEFA Europa League	1QR	(Faroe Islands) B36 Tórshavn	2–0	3–2	5–2
2019–20	UEFA Europa League	2QR	(England) Wolverhampton Wanderers	1–4	0–2	1–6
2022–23	UEFA Europa Conference League	1QR	(Gibraltar) Bruno's Magpies	3–1	1–2	4–3
2022–23	UEFA Europa Conference League	2QR	(Switzerland) Basel	1–1	0–2	1–3
2023–24	UEFA Europa Conference League	1QR	(Finland) Haka	1–0	2–2	3–2
2023–24	UEFA Europa Conference League	2QR	(Norway) Rosenborg	2–2	2–3 (a.e.t.)	4–5
2024–25	UEFA Conference League	1QR	(Wales) Caernarfon Town	3–1 (a.e.t.)	0–2	3–3 (7–8 p)

=== UEFA ranking ===
As of 5 July 2024

Rank	Team	Points
281	(Slovenia) Celje	4.500
282	(Malta) Ħamrun Spartans	4.500
283	(Northern Ireland) Crusaders	4.500
283	(Azerbaijan) Gabala	4.500
285	(Northern Ireland) Larne	4.500

== Players ==
=== Squad ===
As of 23 January 2026

Note: Flags indicate national team as defined under FIFA eligibility rules; some limited exceptions apply. Players may hold more than one non-FIFA nationality.

No.	Pos.	Nation	Player
2	DF	NIR	Kurtis Forsythe
3	DF	IRL	Graham Kelly
4	DF	SCO	Jacob Blaney
5	DF	SCO	Scott Rough
6	MF	NIR	Robbie Weir
7	MF	SCO	Kieran McKechnie
8	MF	WAL	Harry Jewitt-White
9	FW	SCO	Adam Brooks
10	DF	ENG	Finley Thorndike
11	MF	SCO	Elliot Dunlop
12	MF	NIR	Jack Doherty
15	MF	SCO	Owen Wardell
16	MF	NIR	Josh Williamson
17	FW	NIR	Karter Bond

No.	Pos.	Nation	Player
18	FW	SCO	Aaron Reid
19	FW	SCO	Fraser Bryden
20	FW	NIR	Michael Mulholland
21	FW	NIR	Stewart Nixon
22	DF	SCO	Cameron Bruce
23	MF	NIR	Oilibhéar McCart
24	DF	NIR	Leon Barr
26	FW	NIR	Ryan Donnelly
27	FW	NIR	Thomas Maguire
28	DF	NIR	Johnny James
31	GK	NIR	Rian Brown
42	MF	NIR	Lloyd Anderson
43	DF	NIR	Lewis Barr

== Management team ==
Position	Staff
Manager	Declan Caddell
Assistant manager	David Rainey
Coach	Sean O'Neill
Physiotherapist	Tom Ashton
Goalkeeping coach	Mark Boyle
Coach	Steven Livingstone
Club doctor	David McCracken
Club chaplain	Frankie Weir
Kitman	Roy McReynolds

Source: Crusaders F.C.

== Managerial history ==
Name	Years	Senior honours
(Ireland) Albert Mitchell	1950–1952	
(Ireland) Jackie Vernon	1952–1956 (Note: Player-manager from 1952–1955.)	Ulster Cup
(Ireland) Hugh Rankin	1956–1962	County Antrim Shield
(Northern Ireland) Sammy McCrory	1962–1963 (Note: Player-manager.)	
(Northern Ireland) Jimmy Murdough	1963–1966	Ulster Cup, County Antrim Shield
(Ireland) Ted Smyth	1966–1968	Irish Cup
(Ireland) Jimmy Todd	1968–1971	Irish Cup, County Antrim Shield
(Northern Ireland) Billy Johnston	1971–1977	Irish League (2), County Antrim Shield, Carlsberg Cup
(Northern Ireland) Norman Pavis	1977–1979	
(Northern Ireland) Ian Russell	1979–1983	
(Northern Ireland) Clarke Frampton	1983 (Note: Caretaker manager.)	
(Northern Ireland) Tommy Jackson	1983–1986 (Note: Player-manager from 1983–1985.)	Gold Cup
(Northern Ireland) Roy McDonald	1986	
(Scotland) Jackie Hutton	1986–1989	
(Northern Ireland) Roy Walker	1989–1998 (Note: Player-manager from 1989–1993.)	Irish League (2), League Cup, Gold Cup, Ulster Cup, County Antrim Shield
(Republic of Ireland) Aaron Callaghan	1998–1999	
(Republic of Ireland) Martin Murray	1999–2000	
(Northern Ireland) Gary McCartney	2000–2002	
(Northern Ireland) Alan Dornan	2002–2005 (Note: Player-manager from 2002–2003.)	
(Northern Ireland) Roy Bennett	2005	
(Northern Ireland) Stephen Baxter	2005–2024	NIFL Premiership (3), Irish Cup (4), Setanta Cup, League Cup, County Antrim Shield (3), Charity Shield (2)
(Northern Ireland) Declan Caddell	2024–	

== Honours ==
=== Senior honours ===
- Irish League/NIFL Premiership: 7
  - 1972–73, 1975–76, 1994–95, 1996–97, 2014–15, 2015–16, 2017–18
- Irish Cup: 6
  - 1966–67, 1967–68, 2008–09, 2018–19, 2021–22, 2022–23
- Irish League Cup: 2
  - 1996–97, 2011–12
- County Antrim Shield: 8
  - 1959–60, 1964–65, 1968–69, 1973–74, 1991–92, 2009–10, 2017–18, 2018–19
- NIFL Charity Shield: 2
  - 2022, 2023
- Gold Cup: 2
  - 1985–86, 1995–96
- Ulster Cup: 3
  - 1953–54, 1963–64, 1993–94
- Carlsberg Cup: 1
  - 1973–74

=== All-Ireland honours ===
- Setanta Sports Cup: 1
  - 2012

=== Intermediate honours ===
- Irish First Division: 1
  - 2005–06
- Steel & Sons Cup: 8
  - 1922–23, 1926–27, 1928–29, 1930–31, 1933–34, 1936–37, 1947–48, 1953–54, (Note: Won by Crusaders Reserves.) 2005–06
- IFA Intermediate League Cup: 1
  - 2005–06
- Irish Intermediate League: 9
  - 1922–23, 1925–26, 1926–27, 1928–29, 1930–31, 1932–33, 1937–38, 1938–39, 1948–49
- Irish Intermediate Cup: 3
  - 1926–27, 1937–38, 1938–39
- McElroy Cup: 3
  - 1929–30, 1931–32, 1947–48
- Clements Lyttle Cup: 1
  - 1924–25
- Irish League B Division Section 2/NIFL Premiership Development League: 3
  - 1996–97, 2021–22, 2022–23
- George Wilson Cup: 3
  - 1952–53, 2006–07, 2014–15
- Louis Moore Cup: 1
  - 1972–73

=== Junior honours ===
- Irish Junior Alliance First Division: 3
  - 1915–16, 1916–17, 1917–18
- Lyttle Trophy: 3
  - 1915–16, 1917–18, 1920–21 (shared)
- Empire Cup: 1
  - 1905–06
- Polland Cup: 1
  - 1903–04
- Alexandra Alliance: 1
  - 1901–02

=== Friendly honours ===
- Stena Line Trophy: 1
  - 1996–97

== See also ==
- Crusaders Strikers, a women's association football club amalgamated with Crusaders since 2009.
