= 2017–18 NIFL Premiership =

NIFL Premiership
- Season: 2017–18
- Dates: 11 August 2017 – 28 April 2018
- Champions: Crusaders; 3rd Premiership title 7th Irish title
- Relegated: Ballinamallard United; Carrick Rangers (via play-off)
- Champions League: Crusaders
- Europa League: Coleraine; Glenavon; Cliftonville (via play-offs)
- Matches: 228
- Goals: 717 (3.14 per match)
- Top goalscorer: Joe Gormley (22 goals)
- Biggest home win: Crusaders 7–1 Carrick Rangers (18 November 2017)
- Biggest away win: Ballinamallard United 0–6 Linfield (4 November 2017)
- Highest scoring: Ballinamallard United 6–4 Cliftonville (26 January 2018)

The 2017–18 NIFL Premiership (known as the Danske Bank Premiership for sponsorship reasons) was the 10th season of the NIFL Premiership, the highest level of league football in Northern Ireland, the 117th season of Irish league football overall, and the 5th season of the league operating as part of the Northern Ireland Football League.

Crusaders were champions, winning the league for the 7th time.

== Summary ==
The season began on 11 August 2017 and concluded on 28 April 2018, with the play-offs taking place in May 2018.

Linfield were the defending champions from the previous season. On 28 April 2018, Crusaders won the title on the final day of the regular season, defeating Ballymena United 2–1 at the Ballymena Showgrounds to win the league title for the third time in four seasons.

Crusaders qualified for the 2018–19 UEFA Champions League. The runners-up (and 2017–18 Irish Cup winners), Coleraine, along with third-placed Glenavon and the play-off winners, Cliftonville, all qualified for the 2018–19 UEFA Europa League.

== Teams ==
Twelve teams competed in the 2017–18 NIFL Premiership. Portadown were relegated after finishing bottom of the 2016–17 NIFL Premiership and were replaced by Warrenpoint Town as the winners of the 2016–17 NIFL Championship.

Carrick Rangers finished second from bottom but retained their Premiership place after winning the promotion-relegation play-off against NIFL Championship promotion play-off winners Institute 5–2 on aggregate.

=== Stadia and locations ===
Locations of the 2017–18 NIFL Premiership teams
Locations of the Belfast-based 2017–18 NIFL Premiership teams

Club	Stadium	Location	Capacity^{‡}
Ards	Clandeboye Park	Bangor	1,895 (500 seated)
Ballinamallard United	Ferney Park	Ballinamallard	2,000 (250 seated)
Ballymena United	The Showgrounds	Ballymena	3,050 (2,280 seated)
Carrick Rangers	Taylors Avenue	Carrickfergus	4,500 (250 seated)
Cliftonville	Solitude	Belfast	2,530 (all seated)
Coleraine	The Showgrounds	Coleraine	2,496 (1,106 seated)
Crusaders	Seaview	Belfast	3,383 (all seated)
Dungannon Swifts	Stangmore Park	Dungannon	5,000 (300 seated)
Glenavon	Mourneview Park	Lurgan	4,160 (4,000 seated)
Glentoran	The Oval	Belfast	6,054 (4,989 seated)
Linfield	Windsor Park	Belfast	18,614 (all seated)
Warrenpoint Town	Milltown	Warrenpoint	1,280 (150 seated)

== League table ==
Pos	Team	Pld	W	D	L	GF	GA	GD	Pts	Qualification or relegation (Note: Teams played each other three times (33 matches), before the league split into two groups (the top six and the bottom six) for the last five matches.)
1	Crusaders (C)	38	28	7	3	106	38	+68	91	Qualification for the Champions League first qualifying round
2	Coleraine	38	26	11	1	76	31	+45	89	Qualification for the Europa League first qualifying round (Note: As 2017–18 Irish Cup winners, Coleraine, had already qualified for the Europa League as league runners-up, third-placed Glenavon were awarded the berth.)
3	Glenavon	38	19	12	7	85	52	+33	69	Qualification for the Europa League first qualifying round
4	Linfield	38	20	7	11	72	45	+27	67	Qualification for the Europa League play-offs (Note: Cliftonville qualified for the Europa League first qualifying round by winning the Europa League play-offs.)
5	Cliftonville (O)	38	20	5	13	68	45	+23	65	Qualification for the Europa League play-offs
6	Ballymena United	38	14	6	18	53	65	−12	48	Qualification for the Europa League play-offs
7	Glentoran	38	14	9	15	52	52	0	51 (Note: After 33 games, clubs in the bottom half of the table at the split cannot climb into the top half, regardless of the results during matches 34–38.)	Qualification for the Europa League play-offs
8	Dungannon Swifts	38	13	6	19	42	62	−20	45	
9	Ards	38	12	4	22	42	74	−32	40	
10	Warrenpoint Town	38	8	6	24	52	86	−34	30	
11	Carrick Rangers (R)	38	6	5	27	31	78	−47	23	Qualification for the relegation play-offs
12	Ballinamallard United (R)	38	5	8	25	38	89	−51	23	Relegation to the NIFL Championship

Source: RSSSF
Rules for classification: 1) Points; 2) Goal difference; 3) Number of goals scored; 4) Head-to-head points; 5) Head-to-head goal difference; 6) Drawing of lots
(C) Champions; (O) Play-off winners; (R) Relegated

== Results ==
=== Matches 1–22 ===
During matches 1–22 each team plays every other team twice (home and away).

Home \ Away	ARD	BMD	BYM	CRK	CLF	COL	CRU	DUN	GLV	GLT	LIN	WPT
Ards	—	2–1	1–0	1–0	0–1	0–3	2–4	0–1	0–2	0–1	0–2	2–1
Ballinamallard United	0–2	—	1–3	2–0	1–1	0–2	1–5	0–1	0–3	1–2	0–6	1–1
Ballymena United	6–3	2–1	—	3–1	1–0	0–2	1–4	2–1	1–6	1–3	2–1	3–3
Carrick Rangers	0–1	2–0	1–1	—	1–2	1–3	0–3	2–1	0–2	1–1	0–1	0–2
Cliftonville	6–3	5–0	1–0	3–0	—	1–2	1–2	2–1	1–1	1–0	3–2	2–0
Coleraine	4–1	2–1	1–1	3–0	2–0	—	1–1	1–0	4–2	3–0	2–1	2–1
Crusaders	0–0	2–0	2–1	7–1	2–0	1–2	—	1–1	2–3	1–0	2–1	5–0
Dungannon Swifts	0–0	2–0	2–1	4–0	0–4	1–3	0–4	—	0–3	0–2	0–4	2–1
Glenavon	3–0	6–2	4–0	2–0	3–1	2–2	3–4	1–1	—	2–2	0–1	1–0
Glentoran	0–2	2–1	1–1	1–1	0–2	0–0	0–3	2–0	1–3	—	2–1	2–0
Linfield	2–0	4–0	1–0	2–0	2–0	2–1	2–5	1–0	2–3	1–0	—	3–3
Warrenpoint Town	1–0	2–1	1–3	2–2	1–3	0–2	2–3	1–2	2–3	2–3	1–4	—

Source: RSSSF
Legend: Blue = home team win; Yellow = draw; Red = away team win.
For upcoming matches, an "a" indicates there is an article about the rivalry between the two participants.

=== Matches 23–33 ===
During matches 23–33 each team will play every other team for the third time (either at home, or away).

Home \ Away	ARD	BMD	BYM	CRK	CLF	COL	CRU	DUN	GLV	GLT	LIN	WPT
Ards	—	—	1–0	0–4	—	1–3	—	—	1–6	—	0–3	—
Ballinamallard United	0–4	—	—	—	6–4	2–5	0–3	—	—	2–2	2–2	—
Ballymena United	—	2–0	—	3–0	—	0–2	—	—	3–1	—	2–2	1–3
Carrick Rangers	—	2–2	—	—	0–1	—	—	1–0	1–2	1–2	—	1–2
Cliftonville	3–0	—	1–2	—	—	0–0	3–1	3–0	—	—	1–2	—
Coleraine	—	—	—	3–2	—	—	3–3	—	1–1	—	2–2	1–0
Crusaders	1–0	—	3–1	6–0	—	—	—	3–0	—	4–2	—	—
Dungannon Swifts	1–0	2–0	2–3	—	—	0–1	—	—	3–2	0–0	—	—
Glenavon	—	0–0	—	—	1–1	—	1–6	—	—	2–2	—	3–3
Glentoran	1–2	—	1–2	—	1–0	0–2	—	—	—	—	—	5–0
Linfield	—	—	—	2–0	—	—	1–2	0–0	0–2	1–1	—	—
Warrenpoint Town	3–3	1–0	—	—	1–3	—	1–4	3–0	—	—	1–3	—

Source: RSSSF
Legend: Blue = home team win; Yellow = draw; Red = away team win.
For upcoming matches, an "a" indicates there is an article about the rivalry between the two participants.

=== Matches 34–38 ===
During matches 34–38 each team will play every other team in their half of the table once. As this is the fourth time that teams play each other this season, home sides are chosen so that they will have played each other twice at home and twice away.

==== Section A ====
Home \ Away	BYM	CLF	COL	CRU	GLV	LIN
Ballymena United	—	0–3	—	1–2	—	—
Cliftonville	—	—	—	—	1–3	—
Coleraine	1–0	2–1	—	—	—	—
Crusaders	—	1–1	1–1	—	1–1	2–0
Glenavon	0–0	—	0–0	—	—	2–3
Linfield	2–0	1–2	2–2	—	—	—

Source: RSSSF
Legend: Blue = home team win; Yellow = draw; Red = away team win.

==== Section B ====
Home \ Away	ARD	BMD	CRK	DUN	GLT	WPT
Ards	—	1–1	—	3–4	1–4	4–2
Ballinamallard United	—	—	2–1	2–2	—	2–0
Carrick Rangers	0–1	—	—	—	—	—
Dungannon Swifts	—	—	2–0	—	—	4–2
Glentoran	—	1–3	1–2	4–2	—	—
Warrenpoint Town	—	—	2–3	—	1–0	—

Source: RSSSF
Legend: Blue = home team win; Yellow = draw; Red = away team win.

== Play-offs ==
=== UEFA Europa League play-offs ===
As 2017–18 Irish Cup winners, Coleraine, finished as league runners-up, their original runners-up berth in the Europa League was redistributed to third-placed Glenavon. As a result, the four teams finishing 4th–7th took part in Europa League play-offs to decide which one team would qualify for the 2018–19 UEFA Europa League first qualifying round.

==== Semi-finals ====
9 May 2018
19:45 BST

Linfield (4th)	3 – 4	Glentoran (7th)
Byrne 26'; Waterworth 51'; Fallon 90'	BBC Sport; Soccerway	Davidson 63' (pen.); McGuigan 66'; Garrett 79'; Allen 84'

Windsor Park, Belfast
Referee: I. McNabb

9 May 2018
19:45 BST

Cliftonville (5th)	4 – 0	Ballymena United (6th)
Donnelly 67', 81'; Gormley 86', 88'	BBC Sport; Soccerway

Solitude, Belfast
Referee: R. Crangle

==== Final ====
12 May 2018
15:00 BST

Cliftonville (5th)	3 – 2	Glentoran (7th)
Donnelly 24', 64'; Gormley 86'	BBC Sport; Soccerway	McDaid 79'; Allen 83' (pen.)

Solitude, Belfast
Referee: K. Kennedy

Cliftonville were the UEFA Europa League play-off winners, and qualified for the 2018–19 UEFA Europa League first qualifying round.

=== NIFL Premiership play-offs ===
==== Pre-play-off ====
The runners-up and third-placed teams from the Championship were set to take part in a promotion pre-play-off match to decide which team would face the eleventh-placed Premiership team, Carrick Rangers, in the play-off for a place in next season's Premiership. However, as the third-placed Championship team, Harland and Wolff Welders did not apply for a Premiership licence, the second-placed team, Newry City advanced directly to the play-off.

==== Play-off ====
The eleventh-placed team from the Premiership, Carrick Rangers, played Championship runners-up, Newry City, over two legs for a place in the 2018–19 NIFL Premiership.

4 May 2018
19:45 BST
1st Leg

Newry City	3 – 2	Carrick Rangers
McCabe 19'; Hughes 24'; Carville 35' (pen.)	BBC Sport; NIFL	Henderson 4'; McNally 10'

The Showgrounds, Newry
Attendance: 1,200
Referee: Lee Tavinder

9 May 2018
19:45 BST
2nd Leg

Carrick Rangers	1 – 3	Newry City
McNally 29'	NIFL	S. Hughes 36' (pen.); McCabe 56'; M. Hughes 74'

Taylors Avenue, Carrickfergus
Attendance: 1,058
Referee: Evan Boyce

Newry City won 6–3 on aggregate and were promoted to the NIFL Premiership with Carrick Rangers dropping down into the NIFL Championship.

== Top goalscorers ==
As of 11 May 2018

Rank	Scorer	Club	Goals
1	(Northern Ireland) Joe Gormley	Cliftonville	24
2	(Northern Ireland) Gavin Whyte	Crusaders	22
3	(Northern Ireland) Curtis Allen	Glentoran	20
4	(Northern Ireland) Paul Heatley	Crusaders	19
4	(Northern Ireland) Jay Donnelly	Cliftonville	19
6	(Northern Ireland) Andrew Mitchell	Glenavon	18
6	(Northern Ireland) Jordan Owens	Crusaders	18
8	(Republic of Ireland) Darren McAuley	Coleraine	17
9	(Northern Ireland) Jamie McGonigle	Coleraine	16
10	(Northern Ireland) Ryan Curran	Ballinamallard United	14

== Attendances ==
#	Club	Average
1	Linfield	2,256
2	Coleraine	1,702
3	Glentoran	1,615
4	Crusaders	1,494
5	Cliftonville	1,339
6	Glenavon	1,329
7	Ballymena	1,280
8	Dungannon	506
9	Ards	482
10	Ballinamallard	452
11	Carrick	412
12	Warrenpoint	266
