= Sid Burrows =

Northern Irish footballer

Sidney Burrows
Personal information
- Date of birth: 27 March 1964 (age 62)
- Place of birth: Antrim, Northern Ireland

Youth career
- Carnmoney Colts
- Ballyclare Comrades

Senior career*
Years	Team	Apps	(Gls)
1982–1986	Crusaders		(10)
1986–1991	Linfield	184	(27)
1991–1998	Crusaders	?	(54)

International career
1984–1995	Irish League XI	17	(2)
- * Club domestic league appearances and goals

Sid Burrows (born 27 October 1964 in Belfast) is a retired footballer from Northern Ireland who played as a left winger.

Sid began his senior career with Crusaders, before joining Linfield in October 1986. He scored 27 goals in 184 games for Linfield, before he was surprisingly sold to old club Crusaders in 1991, remaining there as captain until 1997 when a cruciate knee ligament injury sustained against Cliftonville ended his career. He coached Crusaders Reserves after his retirement. He was inducted into Crusaders Hall of Fame in 2010.

Now living in Portadown, Burrows previously was coach at intermediate club Laurelvale. More recently he has had coaching spells with some youth teams in the area including most recently Annagh United. A Christian, he is also an Assistant Pastor in the Pentecostal Church.

== Honours ==
Crusaders

- Irish League (2): 1994–95, 1996–97
- Irish League Cup (1): 1996–97
- Gold Cup (2): 1985–86, 1995–96
- Ulster Cup (1): 1993–94
- County Antrim Shield (1): 1991–92

Linfield

- Irish League (2): 1986–87, 1988–89
- Irish League Cup (1): 1986–87
- Gold Cup (3): 1987–88, 1988–89, 1989–90
