= 2017–18 County Antrim Shield =

Tournament details
- Country: Northern Ireland
- Teams: 16

Final positions
- Champions: Crusaders (7th win)
- Runners-up: Ballymena United

Tournament statistics
- Matches played: 15
- Goals scored: 60 (4 per match)

The 2017–18 County Antrim Shield was the 129th edition of the County Antrim Shield, a cup competition in Northern Irish football.

Crusaders won the tournament for the 7th time, defeating Ballymena United 4–2 in the final.

== Results ==
=== First round ===
Team 1	Score	Team 2
Ballyclare Comrades	1–4	Linfield
Ballymena United	3–0	Harland & Wolff Welders
Carrick Rangers	4–2	PSNI
Cliftonville	6–0	Knockbreda
Crusaders	4–0	Donegal Celtic
Glebe Rangers	0–4	Dundela
Glentoran	4–2	Crumlin Star
Larne	0–3	Ards

=== Quarter-finals ===
Team 1	Score	Team 2
Ballymena United	1–0	Glentoran
Carrick Rangers	4–2	Dundela
Cliftonville	2–3	Crusaders
Linfield	0–1	Ards

=== Semi-finals ===
Team 1	Score	Team 2
Ballymena United	3–0	Ards
Crusaders	1–0	Carrick Rangers

=== Final ===
23 January 2018

Ballymena United	2–4	Crusaders
McMurray 54'; Friel 86'	Report	Beverland 8'; Owens 10'; Caddell 23'; Heatley 69'

The Showgrounds, Ballymena
Referee: Andrew Davey (Bangor)
