= 2014–15 NIFL Premiership =

NIFL Premiership
- Season: 2014–15
- Champions: Crusaders; 1st Premiership title 5th Irish title
- Relegated: Institute
- Champions League: Crusaders
- Europa League: Glentoran (via Irish Cup); Linfield; Glenavon
- Matches played: 228
- Goals scored: 719 (3.15 per match)
- Top goalscorer: Joe Gormley (31 goals)
- Biggest home win: Cliftonville 7–0; Ballymena United (29 November 2014); Warrenpoint Town 7–0 Ballinamallard United (23 January 2015)
- Biggest away win: Warrenpoint Town 0–5; Glentoran (3 January 2015); Warrenpoint Town 0–5; Coleraine (14 March 2015)
- Highest scoring: Portadown 5–5; Ballymena United (17 January 2015); Glenavon 3–7 Crusaders (21 February 2015)
- Highest attendance: 6,538; Linfield 2–1 Glentoran (26 December 2014)
- Lowest attendance: 70; Warrenpoint Town 5–1; Institute (4 April 2015)
- Total attendance: 214,547
- Average attendance: 941

The 2014–15 NIFL Premiership (known as the Danske Bank Premiership for sponsorship reasons) was the 7th season of the NIFL Premiership, the highest level of league football in Northern Ireland, the 114th season of Irish league football overall, and the 2nd season of the league operating as part of the newly created Northern Ireland Football League.

Crusaders were champions, winning the league for the 5th time.

== Summary ==
The season began on 9 August 2014, and concluded with the final round of fixtures on 25 April 2015.

Cliftonville were the two-time defending champions, after they won a second consecutive title the previous season, a first consecutive title win in the club's history - their fourth outright league title and fifth overall. Ten years after suffering relegation to the second tier in 2004–05 and just eight years after their return to the top flight in 2006–07, Crusaders were this season's champions. They lifted the title for the fifth time overall on 18 April 2015 – their first top flight title in the 18 years since their last win in the 1996–97 season.

For the second successive season, the newly promoted club finished bottom of the table and suffered relegation. Institute were relegated back to the second tier after only one season in the top flight. This was confirmed after they lost 2–1 against Ballymena United on 11 April 2015, leaving them bottom of the table by nine points with only two fixtures remaining. Warrenpoint Town once again finished in 11th place – the Promotion/relegation play-off place – and faced Bangor over two legs for a place in next season's Premiership. After a 2–2 draw on aggregate, Warrenpoint Town won 3–1 on penalties to retain their Premiership status for next season.

== Teams ==
In their first season back in the top flight since 2005–06, Ards finished bottom of the table the previous season. This was confirmed on 12 April 2014, after Warrenpoint Town defeated Dungannon Swifts 4–0 to leave Ards 10 points adrift in 12th place with only three fixtures remaining. Subsequently, Ards were relegated to Championship 1. Institute replaced them in the Premiership, after securing the 2013–14 Championship 1 title. Institute returned to the top flight for the first time in four years since they were relegated in the 2009–10 season.

The Promotion/relegation play-off was not played the previous season because the runners-up of Championship 1, Bangor, were ineligible for promotion as they did not possess a licence to participate in top-flight football. As a result, this gave a reprieve to the previous season's 11th-placed team, Warrenpoint Town, who retained their Premiership status by default.

=== Stadia and locations ===
Location of teams in the 2014–15 NIFL Premiership
Location of the Belfast-based teams in the 2014–15 NIFL Premiership

Club	Stadium	Location	Capacity
Ballinamallard United	Ferney Park	Ballinamallard	2,000 (250 seated)
Ballymena United	The Showgrounds	Ballymena	3,050 (2,200 seated)
Cliftonville	Solitude	Belfast	2,530 (all seated)
Coleraine	The Showgrounds	Coleraine	2,496 (1,106 seated)
Crusaders	Seaview	Belfast	3,383 (all seated)
Dungannon Swifts	Stangmore Park	Dungannon	5,000 (300 seated)
Glenavon	Mourneview Park	Lurgan	4,160 (4,000 seated)
Glentoran	The Oval	Belfast	6,054 (4,989 seated)
Institute	Riverside Stadium	Drumahoe	3,110 (1,540 seated)
Linfield	Windsor Park	Belfast	10,500 (all seated)
Portadown	Shamrock Park	Portadown	3,940 (2,765 seated)
Warrenpoint Town	Milltown	Warrenpoint	2,000 (250 seated)

=== Windsor Park redevelopment ===
As a result of Windsor Park being redeveloped, its capacity was limited to approximately 10,500. This was still more than large enough to accommodate the average Premiership attendance at the stadium. Linfield were forced to play their first six league games of the season away from home while a new playing surface was laid at the stadium. Linfield's first home league game of the season was on 13 September 2014 against Warrenpoint Town, which resulted in a 1–0 home win. On 31 March 2015, the West Stand of the stadium was sealed off after cracks in the structure were discovered. Construction work related to the stadium redevelopment had been ongoing behind the stand in the weeks prior to the damage, but it was not known if that was directly related. The closure of the stand ultimately forced Linfield to play their remaining two home games of the season against Glenavon and Crusaders at the Ballymena Showgrounds and the Oval respectively.

== League table ==
Pos	Team	Pld	W	D	L	GF	GA	GD	Pts	Qualification or relegation
1	Crusaders (C)	38	25	7	6	93	43	+50	82	Qualification to Champions League first qualifying round
2	Linfield	38	21	9	8	67	46	+21	72	Qualification to Europa League first qualifying round
3	Glenavon	38	20	6	12	82	65	+17	66	Qualification to Europa League first qualifying round
4	Portadown	38	17	11	10	65	56	+9	62	
5	Cliftonville	38	16	13	9	71	47	+24	61	
6	Glentoran	38	16	10	12	67	51	+16	58	Qualification to Europa League first qualifying round (Note: Glentoran qualified for the Europa League first qualifying round as 2014–15 Irish Cup winners.)
7	Ballymena United	38	15	6	17	62	75	−13	51	
8	Coleraine	38	13	7	18	48	55	−7	46 (Note: Coleraine and Institute both fielded an ineligible player in the same match. The original 4–0 Coleraine win was voided with a 3–0 loss being recorded for both clubs, resulting in the final league table having two more losses than wins, and an overall goal difference of –6.)	
9	Ballinamallard United	38	10	9	19	40	71	−31	39	
10	Dungannon Swifts	38	8	13	17	38	56	−18	37	
11	Warrenpoint Town (O)	38	6	12	20	50	76	−26	30	Qualification to Promotion/relegation play-off
12	Institute (R)	38	4	9	25	36	84	−48	21	Relegation to NIFL Championship 1

Source: rsssf.com
Rules for classification: 1) Points; 2) Goal difference; 3) Number of goals scored; 4) Head-to-head points; 5) Head-to-head goal difference
(C) Champions; (O) Play-off winners; (R) Relegated

== Results ==
=== Matches 1–22 ===
During matches 1–22 each team played every other team twice (home and away).

Home \ Away	BMD	BYM	CLI	COL	CRU	DUN	GLA	GLT	INS	LIN	POR	WPT
Ballinamallard United		3–0	0–4	1–0	1–1	2–0	1–0	2–2	2–3	1–3	0–2	3–1
Ballymena United	3–0		2–2	0–2	0–2	2–2	1–4	2–2	2–1	2–3	3–2	2–0
Cliftonville	3–2	7–0		2–3	0–1	1–1	3–3	0–0	4–0	0–0	2–0	3–1
Coleraine	1–1	1–2	2–0		2–6	1–2	2–1	1–0	NR (Note: Original 4–0 result overturned to a 0–3 defeat for both clubs, after both fielded ineligible players in the match.)	1–2	0–0	0–0
Crusaders	3–1	2–2	0–1	3–0		1–0	1–4	1–0	3–2	2–2	2–3	3–0
Dungannon Swifts	1–1	0–3	1–3	0–1	2–2		2–1	2–3	2–2	0–1	2–3	0–2
Glenavon	1–0	2–1	1–3	2–3	2–2	0–2		1–2	1–1	1–2	2–4	3–2
Glentoran	3–1	4–0	2–1	2–0	1–3	1–0	2–4		2–1	2–3	1–1	3–1
Institute	0–2	1–2	2–3	2–0	1–1	1–1	1–4	1–1		1–1	0–4	1–0
Linfield	3–0	3–2	1–3	2–1	1–2	4–0	0–1	2–2	3–1		3–2	1–0
Portadown	3–0	2–1	0–1	0–2	3–1	1–0	3–2	3–1	4–1	3–0		2–2
Warrenpoint Town	2–0	2–2	1–1	1–3	0–3	3–3	0–2	2–5	0–1	1–2	2–1	

Source: rsssf.com
Legend: Blue = home team win; Yellow = draw; Red = away team win.

=== Matches 23–33 ===
During matches 23–33 each team played every other team for the third time (either at home, or away).

Home \ Away	BMD	BYM	CLI	COL	CRU	DUN	GLA	GLT	INS	LIN	POR	WPT
Ballinamallard United		1–3	1–1	2–1			1–3			1–1	0–0	
Ballymena United				4–3	1–3		2–4	1–3	3–0			
Cliftonville		1–0					2–3	1–1	5–1			2–2
Coleraine			0–0		1–5	1–2	1–1	1–1			0–1	
Crusaders	3–0		4–1						3–1	2–1	6–0	4–1
Dungannon Swifts	2–0	1–0	1–1		1–1					0–3		
Glenavon					3–7	2–1			2–1	1–0		2–2
Glentoran	4–0				1–2	2–0	1–2		4–1			
Institute	1–1			0–2		1–2				0–1		1–1
Linfield		2–1	2–2	1–1				2–1			1–2	3–0
Portadown		5–5	0–2			1–1	3–3	1–1	2–1			
Warrenpoint Town	7–0	2–0		0–5		1–1		0–5			0–0	

Source: rsssf.com
Legend: Blue = home team win; Yellow = draw; Red = away team win.

=== Matches 34–38 ===
During matches 34–38 each team played every other team in their half of the table once. As this was the fourth time that teams had played each other this season, home sides were chosen so that they had played each other twice at home and twice away.

==== Section A ====
Home \ Away	CLI	CRU	GLA	GLT	LIN	POR
Cliftonville		0–1			2–2	4–0
Crusaders			4–0	2–0		
Glenavon	5–0			4–0		3–2
Glentoran	1–0				1–2	0–0
Linfield		3–1	0–2			
Portadown		1–0			1–1	

Source: rsssf.com
Legend: Blue = home team win; Yellow = draw; Red = away team win.

==== Section B ====
Home \ Away	BMD	BYM	COL	DUN	INS	WPT
Ballinamallard United				1–0	2–0	3–3
Ballymena United	2–1			1–0		2–1
Coleraine	1–2	0–1			3–1	2–1
Dungannon Swifts			1–0		1–1	1–1
Institute		1–2				
Warrenpoint Town					5–1	

Source: rsssf.com
Legend: Blue = home team win; Yellow = draw; Red = away team win.

== Promotion/relegation play-off ==
11th-placed Warrenpoint Town played NIFL Championship 1 runners-up Bangor over two legs for a place in next season's Premiership. Warrenpoint Town played the first leg away from home, with home advantage for the second leg. Warrenpoint Town won 3–1 on penalties and retained their Premiership status.

28 April 2015
19:45 BST

Bangor	2–0	Warrenpoint Town
Moan 29' (o.g.); McDowell 90+2'	Report

Clandeboye Park, Bangor
Referee: Ian McNabb

1 May 2015
19:45 BST

Warrenpoint Town	2–0 (a.e.t.)	Bangor
McDonald 12'; McVeigh 76'	Report
Penalties
McGuigan (penalty scored); McDonnell (penalty missed); M. Hughes (penalty missed); McVeigh (penalty scored); S. Hughes (penalty scored)	3–1	Cooling (penalty missed); McDowell (penalty scored); Gardiner (penalty missed); Hall (penalty missed)

Milltown, Warrenpoint

2–2 on aggregate after extra time. Warrenpoint Town won 3–1 on penalties.

== Season statistics ==
=== Top goalscorers ===
Rank	Scorer	Club	Goals
1	(Northern Ireland) Joe Gormley	Cliftonville	31
2	(Northern Ireland) Paul Heatley	Crusaders	27
3	(Northern Ireland) Jordan Owens	Crusaders	26
4	(Northern Ireland) Aaron Burns	Linfield	17
4	(Northern Ireland) Daniel Hughes	Warrenpoint Town	17
6	(Northern Ireland) Curtis Allen	Glentoran	15
6	(Northern Ireland) Kevin Braniff	Glenavon	15
6	(Northern Ireland) Andrew Waterworth	Linfield	15
9	(Northern Ireland) Eoin Bradley	Glenavon	13
9	(Northern Ireland) Darren Murray	Portadown	13
9	(Northern Ireland) Jordan Stewart	Glentoran	13
9	(Scotland) Gary Twigg	Portadown	13
