= 2018–19 County Antrim Shield =

Tournament details
- Country: Northern Ireland
- Teams: 16

Final positions
- Champions: Crusaders (8th win)
- Runners-up: Linfield

Tournament statistics
- Matches played: 15
- Goals scored: 54 (3.6 per match)

The 2018–19 County Antrim Shield was the 130th edition of the County Antrim Shield, a cup competition in Northern Irish football.

Crusaders won the tournament for the 8th time and 2nd consecutive season, defeating Linfield 4–3 in the final.

== Results ==
=== First round ===
Team 1	Score	Team 2
Ards	1–0	Dundela
Ballyclare Comrades	3–1	Newington
Ballymena United	5–0	Harland & Wolff Welders
Carrick Rangers	0–2	Larne
Cliftonville	5–0	Lisburn Distillery
Crusaders	2–1	Knockbreda
Glentoran	2–1	Queen's University
Linfield	2–1	PSNI

=== Quarter-finals ===
Team 1	Score	Team 2
Ballymena United	3–0	Ballyclare Comrades
Crusaders	4–3	Cliftonville
Larne	3–1	Ards
Linfield	2–1	Glentoran

=== Semi-finals ===
Team 1	Score	Team 2
Ballymena United	1–2	Linfield
Crusaders	1–0	Larne

=== Final ===
12 March 2019

Crusaders	4–3	Linfield
Cushley 27', 90'; Coates 61'; Forsythe 88'	Report	Stafford 8'; Millar 28'; Coates 29' (o.g.)

Seaview, Belfast
Referee: Evan Boyce
