= NIFL Charity Shield =

Association football cup in Northern Ireland

- Founded: 1992
- Region: Northern Ireland
- Teams: 2
- Current champions: Larne (2026)
- Most championships: Linfield – 4 titles (3 outright, 1 shared)
- Website: NI Football League

The Northern Ireland Football League Charity Shield is the national association football super cup in Northern Ireland. It has been held on an occasional basis since its inauguration in 1992. It pits together the previous campaign's NIFL Premiership champions and Irish Cup winners, providing the opening match of the Irish League season.

Dungannon Swifts are the current holders, after they defeated Linfield 5–3 on penalties in the 2025 edition to win the competition for the first time.

== Sponsorship ==
McEwan's Lager sponsored the competition between 1992 and 1994, and Wilkinson Sword were sponsors from 1998 until 2000, both of whom also sponsored other competitions in Irish League football. The proceeds from the 2014 and 2015 editions were donated to the Northern Ireland Hospice.

== Format ==
The Shield is held in early August as a single match. In the 1992 and 1993 editions, the trophy was shared between the two competing sides for six months when both matches finished level at full-time. However, the rules were later changed to ensure an outright winner. In the 2014 edition, a penalty shoot-out was used to determine the winner when the match ended level after 90 minutes, without extra time being played.

== Results ==
Key:

&	Title was shared after match finished in a draw
pens.	Scores level after extra time. A penalty shootout was required to determine the winner.
pens.	Scores level after full time. A penalty shootout was required to determine the winner.

Year	Date	Winner	Score	Runner-up	Venue	Attendance	Ref
1992	8 August	Glenavon; Glentoran	1–1^{&}	—	Windsor Park, Belfast	2,000
1993	10 August	Bangor; Linfield	1–1^{&}	—	Windsor Park, Belfast
1994	3 August	Linfield	2–0	Bangor	Windsor Park, Belfast
1998	8 August	Cliftonville	1–0	Glentoran	The Oval, Belfast	2,000
1999	8 August	Portadown	2–1	Glentoran	Mourneview Park, Lurgan	2,000
2000	5 August	Linfield	2–0	Glentoran	Windsor Park, Belfast	10,500
2014	2 August	Cliftonville	0 – 0 (a.e.t.) (4 – 2 pens.)	Ballymena United	Solitude, Belfast
2015	1 August	Glentoran	1–0	Crusaders	Solitude, Belfast
2016	30 July	Glenavon	1–0	Crusaders	Mourneview Park, Lurgan
2017	5 August	Linfield	3–1	Coleraine	The Oval, Belfast
2022	6 August	Crusaders	2–0	Linfield	Windsor Park, Belfast
2023	1 July	Crusaders	2–0	Larne	Inver Park, Larne
2024	5 July	Larne	2–1	Cliftonville	Inver Park, Larne
2025	4 July	Dungannon Swifts	0 – 0 (5 – 3 pens.)	Linfield	Windsor Park, Belfast
2026	3 July	Larne	0 – 0 (3 – 2 pens.)	Coleraine	Inver Park, Larne

== Performance by club ==
Team	Winners	Runners-up	Winners Years	Runners-up Years
Linfield	4 (1 shared)	2	1993 (shared), 1994, 2000, 2017	2022, 2025
Glentoran	2 (1 shared)	3	1992 (shared), 2015	1998, 1999, 2000
Crusaders	2	2	2022, 2023	2015, 2016
Cliftonville	2	1	1998, 2014	2024
Larne	2	1	2024, 2026	2023
Glenavon	2 (1 shared)	—	1992 (shared), 2016	—
Bangor	1 (shared)	1	1993 (shared)	1994
Portadown	1	—	1999	—
Dungannon Swifts	1	—	2025	—
Coleraine	—	2	—	2017, 2026
Ballymena United	—	1	—	2014
