= 2012 Setanta Sports Cup final =

The 2012 Setanta Sports Cup final was played on 12 May 2012, and was originally scheduled to be played at Windsor Park in Belfast. On 26 April, it was announced that the venue was to be changed to The Oval, also in Belfast. The cup was won by Crusaders on penalties.

== Match details ==
12 May 2012
16:00

Crusaders (Northern Ireland)	2–2 (a.e.t.)	(Republic of Ireland) Derry City
Coates 85', 96'	(Report)	Patterson 80', 101' (pen.)
Penalties
Coates (penalty scored); Morrow (penalty scored); Snoddy (penalty scored); Gargan (penalty missed); Dallas (penalty scored); McKeown (penalty scored)	5–4	(penalty scored) Patterson; (penalty scored) Higgins; (penalty scored) Molloy; (penalty missed) Morrison; (penalty scored) McEleney; (penalty missed) McCaffrey

The Oval, Belfast
Attendance: 3,275
Referee: Raymond Crangle

GK	1	(Northern Ireland) Sean O'Neill
DF	4	Paul Leeman
DF	6	(Northern Ireland) Colin Coates (c)
DF	5	David Magowan
DF	3	(Northern Ireland) Stephen McBride	(yellow card) 57'	(yellow card) 90' (red card)
MF	16	Aidan Watson		(substituted off) 93'
MF	8	Chris Morrow	(yellow card) 82'
MF	14	(Northern Ireland) Stuart Dallas	(yellow card) 36'
MF	12	Declan Caddell		(substituted off) 111'
FW	10	David Rainey		(substituted off) 96'
FW	9	Timmy Adamson		(substituted off) 91'
Substitutes:
DF	2	Gareth McKeown		(substituted on) 91'
MF	7	Ryan McCann
MF	11	Ciaran Gargan		(substituted on) 111'
DF	15	David McMaster
MF	20	David Gibson
FW	13	Matthew Snoddy		(substituted on) 96'
FW	17	Michael Halliday
Manager:
(Northern Ireland) Stephen Baxter Man of the Match: Colin Coates (Crusaders)

GK	1	(Republic of Ireland) Gerard Doherty (c)
DF	17	(Republic of Ireland) Simon Madden
DF	6	Shane McEleney
DF	12	Ryan McBride
DF	3	(Northern Ireland) Dermot McCaffrey		(substituted off) 59'
MF	7	(Northern Ireland) Ruaidhri Higgins
MF	10	(Republic of Ireland) Patrick McEleney
MF	4	Barry Molloy
MF	15	Stephen McLaughlin		(substituted off) 62'
FW	11	(Northern Ireland) Rory Patterson	(yellow card) 89'
FW	9	David McDaid		(substituted off) 59'
Substitutes:
GK	22	Eugene Ferry
DF	2	(Northern Ireland) Eddie McCallion		(substituted on) 106'
DF		Michael Barr
MF	14	Brian McGroary
MF	19	(Northern Ireland) Owen Morrison
FW	23	Ryan Curran
FW	26	Matt Crossan
Manager:
(Northern Ireland) Declan Devine

== See also ==
- 2012 Setanta Sports Cup
