= Stuart Dallas =

Northern Irish footballer (born 1991)

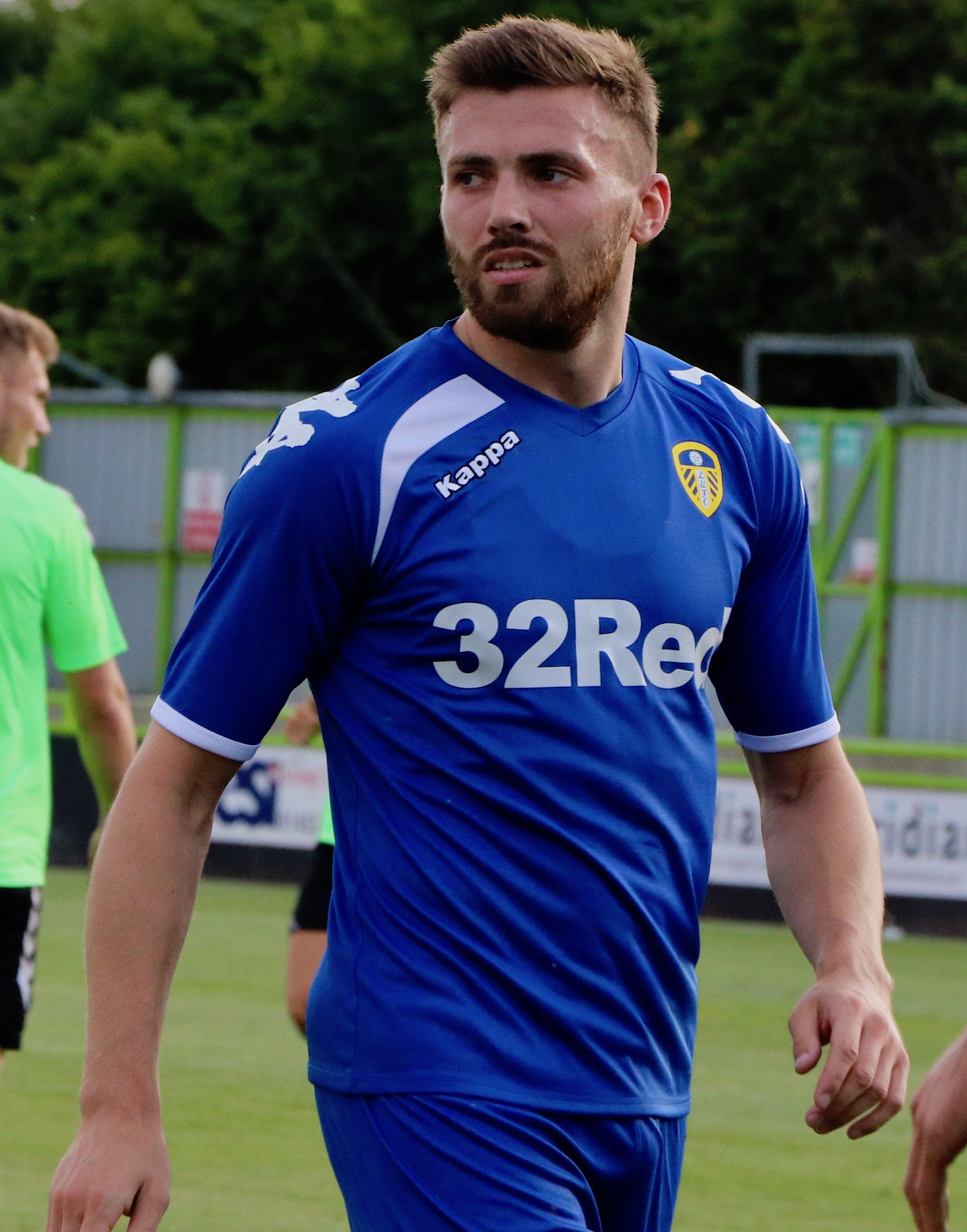
- Dallas playing for Leeds United in 2018

Personal information
- Full name: Stuart Dallas
- Date of birth: 19 April 1991 (age 35)
- Place of birth: Cookstown, Northern Ireland
- Height: 6 ft 0 in (1.83 m)
- Positions: Winger; midfielder; full-back

Youth career
- Cookstown Youth

Senior career*
Years	Team	Apps	(Gls)
2007–2010	Coagh United		
2010–2012	Crusaders	67	(24)
2012–2015	Brentford	63	(8)
2013	→ Northampton Town (loan)	12	(3)
2015–2024	Leeds United	248	(25)
Total		390	(60)

International career
2010	Northern Ireland Junior	3	(1)
2010	Northern Ireland U23	1	(0)
2011–2012	Northern Ireland U21	2	(0)
2011–2022	Northern Ireland	62	(3)
- * Club domestic league appearances and goals

Stuart Dallas (born 19 April 1991) is a Northern Irish former professional footballer who played as a midfielder or full-back.

He had also been deployed as a winger in his early career, but in later seasons Dallas gained prominence as a utility player, appearing more often in midfield and at full-back. He was a key part of the Leeds United side under Marcelo Bielsa that won the 2019–20 EFL Championship and promotion to the Premier League. Dallas was also a regular for the Northern Ireland national team, having earned over fifty caps since his debut in 2011, and played at UEFA Euro 2016.

Dallas retired from football on 10 April 2024 after a two-year battle with a knee injury suffered in April 2022 in a match against Manchester City.

== Club career ==
=== Coagh United and Crusaders ===
Born in Cookstown, Dallas grew up in Cookstown and attended Cookstown Primary School and Cookstown High School during his education, winning the U14 and U15 Coleraine and District League titles with the high school in 2004 and 2005. He started his career at Coagh United, where he made his debut in 2007 whilst working as a joiner. In January 2010, Dallas played in a 4–0 Irish Cup sixth round defeat against Crusaders, with Dallas' performance prompting Crusaders manager Stephen Baxter to talk to Dallas and his father about the possibility of offering him a contract. A deal was agreed later that week, with Dallas joining Crusaders in the summer of 2010, training once a week and earning £70 a week. He made his debut against Donegal Celtic on 7 August 2010. He scored his first goals against Coleraine on 21 August, and his first goal at Seaview proved to be the winning goal in a 5–4 victory over Glenavon. He was chosen as both the Northern Ireland Football Writers' Association Player of the Year and Young Player of the Year for the 2010–11 season. Dallas made 38 appearances and scored 16 goals during the 2010–11 season.

Dallas made two appearances in Crusaders' Europa League second qualifying round matches against Premier League side Fulham early in the 2011–12 season, starting both games as Crusaders lost 7–1 on aggregate. Dallas' final goal for Crusaders was the winning goal against Portadown on 2 January 2012, and his final match was the 2012 Setanta Sports Cup final victory over Derry City, in which he scored in the penalty shootout. Dallas made 47 appearances and scored 10 goals during the 2011–12 season. He departed the club in the summer of 2012, after making 85 appearances and scoring 26 goals during his two seasons with Crusaders.

=== Brentford ===
On 12 April 2012, it was announced that Dallas had signed a pre-contract with League One side Brentford who were managed by Uwe Rosler and he joined the club that summer. He made his debut for the Bees (the first professional appearance of his career) in a 1–0 Football League Trophy win over Crawley Town on 9 October, coming off the bench after 75 minutes to replace Scott Barron. He made his league debut 4 days later as a substitute in a 1–1 draw away to Scunthorpe United. His first start came in a 4–2 FA Cup replay win at home to Bradford City on 18 December. He made 11 appearances over the course of the 2012–13 season and scored no goals.

After making 3 cup appearances for Brentford in the 2013–14 season, Dallas signed for League Two side Northampton Town on a month's loan on 5 October 2013 and went straight into the squad for the Cobblers' match that day against AFC Wimbledon. After replacing Chris Hackett in the 57th minute, he scored Northampton's second goal in a 2–0 victory. He bagged his second Northampton goal in his third match for the club, following up fellow Brentford loanee Luke Norris's opener in a 3–2 defeat to Rochdale on 22 October. On 5 November, Dallas' loan was extended until 1 January 2014. He scored the only goal of the game against Accrington Stanley on 30 November. An injury suffered to Brentford's on-loan Cardiff City winger Kadeem Harris meant that Dallas was recalled early from his loan on 23 December. He made 12 appearances for Northampton and scored three goals. Of his time at Northampton, Dallas said "on a personal note my loan spell was OK. I was playing every week. It was a good experience but results did not go our way and it was hard, when you are at the bottom everything seems to go against you". He also remarked that the training was less intense than he was used to at Brentford. Dallas signed a new two-year contract at Brentford on 13 November, which would have kept him at Griffin Park until the end of the 2015–16 season. Dallas found his minutes on the pitch limited during the early months of 2014, but he broke into the starting lineup in April, starting in six of the Bees' final seven games of the season. Dallas scored his first Brentford goal with what turned out to be a consolation in a 4–1 defeat to Colchester United on 26 April. He made it two in two games when he scored the opener in a 2–0 win over Stevenage on the final day. Dallas made 21 appearances and scored two goals in a season in which Brentford secured automatic promotion to the Championship.

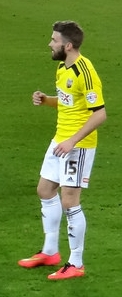
Dallas playing for Brentford in December 2014

On 26 June 2014, Dallas signed a new three-year contract, potentially keeping him at Griffin Park until the summer of 2017. He scored his first goal of the 2014–15 season on his second appearance of the campaign, scoring two goals in the opening ten minutes of a League Cup first round shootout victory over Dagenham & Redbridge, which finished 6–6 after extra time, equalling the record number of goals scored in a League Cup match. He also converted Brentford's first penalty in the shootout. Dallas scored his first league goal of the season on 19 August 2014, bagging the winner in a 2–1 victory over Blackpool. A quadriceps injury suffered in a 3–0 defeat to Norwich City on 16 September ended Dallas' fine start to the 2014–15 season. He made his comeback from injury on 1 November against Derby County, replacing Jon Toral after 66 minutes. With the score at 1–1, he scored his fourth goal of the season with a dramatic 93rd-minute winner. In the following game, Dallas was pressed into service as an emergency right-back for the final 25 minutes of a 3–1 win over Nottingham Forest, having replaced the injured Moses Odubajo. He later deputised on the opposite flank for the suspended Jake Bidwell in February 2015. Dallas netted his sixth goal of the season with the only goal of the game versus Rotherham United on 10 January 2015, a performance which established him in the starting lineup. After nearly four months without a goal, Dallas scored twice in the Bees' 4–1 win over bitter rivals Fulham at Craven Cottage on 3 April. His second strike later won the club's Goal of the Season award. He failed to score again during the season, which ended in defeat to Middlesbrough in the playoff semi-finals. Dallas made 44 appearances and scored eight goals during the 2014–15 season. On 31 July 2015, the Yorkshire Evening Post reported that Brentford had accepted a bid for Dallas of over £1m from fellow Championship side Leeds United. On 1 August 2015, new Brentford Head Coach Marinus Dijkhuizen revealed that Dallas did not want to sign a new contract at Brentford with a year remaining of his current contract and that he was likely to leave the club.

=== Leeds United ===
In August 2015, Dallas joined Leeds United on a three-year deal for an undisclosed fee, reported to be in the region of £1.3 million. He made his debut for Leeds in the Football League Championship in a 1–1 draw against Burnley on the opening day of the season, and scored his first goal for the club against Wolverhampton Wanderers on 17 December 2015. Dallas scored a brace in a 2–1 win away to Birmingham City on 12 April 2016 with two goals from 20 yards into the bottom left corner. He made 49 appearances for the club across the 2015–16 season, more than any other player in the squad, and scored five goals. He won the Leeds United Players' Player Of The Year award for 2015–16.

After missing part of pre-season training for the 2016–17 season due to his participation in UEFA Euro 2016 with Northern Ireland, Dallas started Leeds' first match of the season as they lost 3–0 away to Queens Park Rangers, but suffered a calf injury whilst on international duty with Northern Ireland in October 2016. He returned in November 2016 as a substitute in a 2–1 win away to Rotherham United and scored his first goal of the season on 9 January 2017 with Leeds' first goal of a 2–1 FA Cup win away to Cambridge United. In total, Dallas scored three goals in 35 appearances in all competitions that season. In August 2017, Dallas signed a new three-year contract at the club keeping him at Leeds until the 2019–20 season. Due to injuries to several fullbacks, including Luke Ayling and Laurens De Bock, Dallas was used as a right-back for periods during the 2017–18 season. He scored two goals in 32 appearances for Leeds across the 2017–18 season.

During the 2018–19 season, Dallas played in several positions under new head coach Marcelo Bielsa before long-term injuries to Luke Ayling and Gaetano Berardi meant Dallas had an extended run in the side as right-back. He scored his first goal of the season on 27 November in a 1–0 win against Reading. However, on 1 December, Dallas broke his foot after picking up the injury in a 1–0 win against Sheffield United, which ruled him out for several weeks. However, after his return to training, Dallas was ruled out for another 6 weeks after picking up another injury in January 2019. After Leeds finished the regular season in third place, they qualified for the play-offs. Dallas started both legs of the Championship play-off semi-final against Derby County at left-back, following his return from injury, due to injuries to Barry Douglas, Gjanni Alioski and Leif Davis. Leeds won the first leg of the play-off semi-final, a 1–0 win at Pride Park, but despite two goals from Dallas, Leeds lost the reverse leg 4–2 at Elland Road, seeing Derby progress to the final against Aston Villa. Dallas played 29 games in all competitions across the 2018–19 season, scoring four goals.

In June 2019, fellow compatriot Bailey Peacock-Farrell revealed he and Dallas had turned down the option of starting pre-season training a week later after featuring on international duty for Northern Ireland over the summer, in order to fight for a starting spot. On 24 August, Dallas scored his first goal of the 2019–20 season in a 3–0 win over Stoke City. In September 2019, Dallas signed a new four-year contract extension with Leeds. He found himself one of the first names on the first team sheet, being ever present for the first half of the season, playing in a range of positions, including left-back, right-back and central midfield after injuries to Adam Forshaw, Jamie Shackleton, Tyler Roberts and Pablo Hernández. After the English professional football season was paused in March 2020 due to the COVID-19 pandemic, the season was recovered in June, where Dallas earned promotion with Leeds to the Premier League as EFL Championship champions. After scoring five goals in 46 appearances for Leeds across the 2019–20 season, he won Leeds' Players' Player of the Season award.

Dallas made his Premier League debut in the first match of the season against Liverpool on 12 September 2020, starting in the 4–3 defeat at Anfield to the reigning champions. He scored his first Premier League goal on 2 November 2020 in a 4–1 home defeat to Leicester City after his cross "flew over everybody in the box and into Schmeichel's net". Dallas made his 200th appearance for the club on 22 November 2020 in a 0–0 draw with Arsenal. On 10 April 2021, he scored both goals as Leeds won 2–1 away at Manchester City despite playing the second-half with ten players following a red card for Liam Cooper. Manager Bielsa praised his performance, stating that it gave him "great happiness" because his game is based on "a lot of generosity" adding that "this year has allowed Dallas to show a part of himself that we didn’t know he had." Dallas scored eight goals in 38 appearances, and was awarded Leeds' Player of the Season, Players' Player of the Season and Goal of the Season (his second against Manchester City in April) awards. In July 2021, he signed a new three-year contract with the club.

Dallas scored his only goal of the 2021–22 season on 2 January 2022 in a 3–1 victory over Burnley in the league. On 30 April 2022, Dallas suffered a serious knee injury in a clash with Manchester City's Jack Grealish. It was later confirmed that Dallas had suffered a femoral fracture and underwent surgery in London, an injury that subsequently kept him out for the entire 2022–23 campaign, during which Leeds suffered relegation to the Championship.

Despite returning to team training in September 2023, Dallas was still in recovery, and would also miss the entirety of the 2023–24 campaign in the EFL Championship.

On 10 April 2024, Dallas announced his retirement from professional football following his 2-year long battle with injury, stating that he "must now accept the fact [his] knee suffered irreparable damage". Northern Ireland manager Michael O'Neill stated that Dallas had "maximized everything from his career". He made over 400 appearances for club and country across 17 years as a footballer.

== International career ==
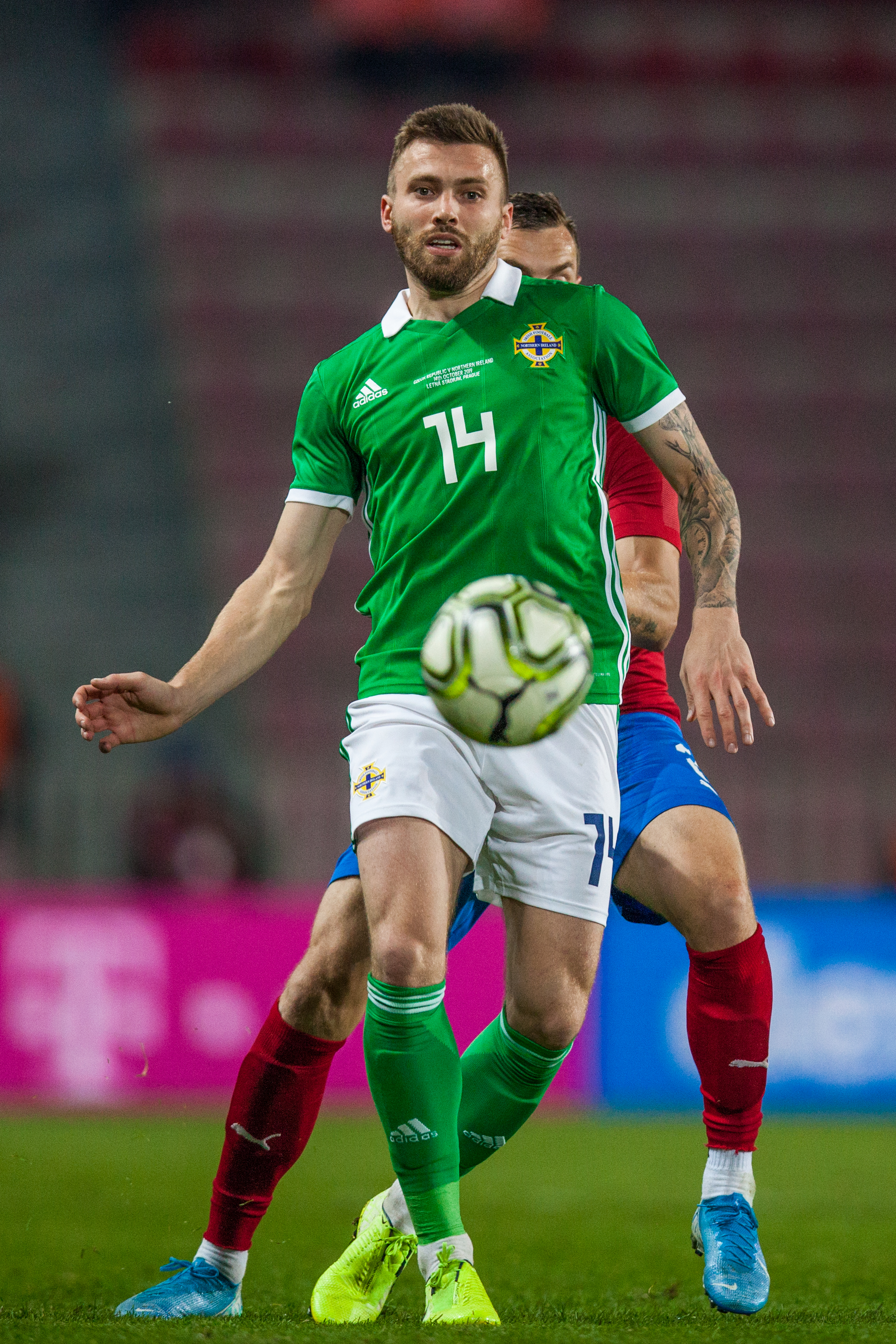
Dallas playing for Northern Ireland in 2019

Due to his form for Crusaders early in the 2010–11 season, Dallas (along with team-mates Chris Keenan, Martin Donnelly and Jordan Owens) received a call-up to the Northern Ireland U23 squad for an International Challenge Trophy match versus Portugal U23 on 12 October 2010. He played the full 90 minutes of the 2–0 defeat. At the end of the 2010–11 season, along with teammates Colin Coates and Jordan Owens, Dallas received a call-up to the full Northern Ireland squad for 2011 Nations Cup games against Republic of Ireland and Wales. He made his debut against Wales in Dublin, coming on in the 63rd minute for Craig Cathcart. Early in the 2011–12 season, Dallas received a call into the Under-21 side for a 2013 UEFA European Under-21 Championship qualification match against Denmark on 6 September 2011. He played 65 minutes of the 3–0 defeat, before being substituted for future Brentford teammate Will Grigg.

A run of starts for Brentford since January 2015 saw Dallas called up for matches versus Scotland and Finland in late March 2015. He won his first full international cap in nearly four years against Scotland on 25 March, playing the full 90 minutes of a 1–0 defeat. On 31 May 2015, Dallas combined with Will Grigg to score his first ever international goal in a 1–1 draw with Qatar at Gresty Road (Crewe, England).

On 8 October 2015, Northern Ireland qualified for UEFA Euro 2016 in France, beating Greece 3–1. It was the first time in 30 years that Northern Ireland had qualified for a major tournament, with Dallas playing a crucial role in qualifying. On 18 May 2016, Dallas was selected as part of the provisional 27-man squad for the Euro 2016 competition, and ten days later was named in the final 23-man squad. Dallas came on as a half time substitute for Paddy McNair in Northern Ireland's 1–0 loss in their opening UEFA Euro 2016 game against Poland on 12 June 2016. On 16 June, he started in their 2–0 victory over Ukraine and his parried shot fell to Niall McGinn to score Northern Ireland's second goal in the sixth minute of second-half stoppage time.

On 10 June 2017, Dallas scored the winner for Northern Ireland in their 1–0 2018 World Cup qualifying victory against Azerbaijan. Dallas played 8 times in World Cup qualification Group C as Northern Ireland finished 2nd in the group and progressed to the second qualification round. Dallas started both legs of the two-legged tie against Switzerland as Northern Ireland lost 1–0 on aggregate and missed out on qualification to the World Cup.

Dallas played 9 times in Euro 2020 qualifying Group C as they failed to qualify for the tournament, losing to Slovakia after extra time in the Path B play-off final.

== Style of play ==
Predominantly a defensive midfielder, Dallas was also noted for his versatility, being able to play as a full-back or winger on either side of the pitch or as a central midfielder and having once played in five positions in the same match for Northern Ireland. Former Leeds manager David O'Leary stated that "the big thing about him is the way he is adaptable to so many positions and, when he has to play in all those different positions, he doesn't let the side down in any way". He was often described as a utility player, with Darren Bent describing him as "probably the best utility man in history". Crusaders manager Stephen Baxter stated that "he could play left-wing, right-wing, centre-forward or the number 10. People have had him playing left-back and right-back but any position works for him because of his great athleticism to get around the park and his brain."

== Personal life ==
Dallas is the younger brother of fellow footballer Marcus Dallas, who played for Loughgall. After getting engaged in 2013, Dallas married his long-term partner Juneve Lamont in June 2016, having been in a relationship with her from the age of 16 when they both attended Cookstown High School. He and his wife have three children.

== Career statistics ==
=== Club ===
Appearances and goals by club, season and competition
Club	Season	League			National cup (Note: Includes Irish Cup, FA Cup)		League cup (Note: Includes Northern Ireland Football League Cup, Football League Cup/EFL Cup)		Other		Total	
Club	Season	Division	Apps	Goals	Apps	Goals	Apps	Goals	Apps	Goals	Apps	Goals
Crusaders	2010–11	IFA Premiership	35	16	0	0	3	0	0	0	38	16
Crusaders	2011–12	IFA Premiership	32	8	4	0	4	2	7 (Note: Five appearances in Setanta Sports Cup, two in UEFA Europa League)	0	47	10
Crusaders	Total		67	24	4	0	7	2	7	0	85	26
Brentford	2012–13	League One	7	0	3	0	0	0	1 (Note: Appearances in Football League Trophy)	0	11	0
Brentford	2013–14	League One	18	2	0	0	2	0	1	0	21	2
Brentford	2014–15	Championship	38	6	1	0	2	2	2 (Note: Appearances in Championship play-offs)	0	43	8
Brentford	Total		63	8	4	0	4	2	4	0	75	10
Northampton Town (loan)	2013–14	League Two	12	3	—		—		—		12	3
Leeds United	2015–16	Championship	45	5	3	0	1	0	—		49	5
Leeds United	2016–17	Championship	31	2	2	1	2	0	—		35	3
Leeds United	2017–18	Championship	29	2	0	0	3	0	—		32	2
Leeds United	2018–19	Championship	26	2	0	0	1	0	2	2	29	4
Leeds United	2019–20	Championship	45	5	1	0	0	0	—		46	5
Leeds United	2020–21	Premier League	38	8	0	0	0	0	—		38	8
Leeds United	2021–22	Premier League	34	1	1	0	2	0	—		37	1
Leeds United	2022–23	Premier League	0	0	0	0	0	0	—		0	0
Leeds United	2023–24	Championship	0	0	0	0	0	0	—		0	0
Leeds United	Total		249	25	7	1	9	0	2	2	266	28
Career total			390	60	15	1	20	4	13	2	438	67

=== International ===
Appearances and goals by national team and year
National team	Year	Apps	Goals
Northern Ireland	2011	1	0
Northern Ireland	2015	9	1
Northern Ireland	2016	9	0
Northern Ireland	2017	9	1
Northern Ireland	2018	8	1
Northern Ireland	2019	5	0
Northern Ireland	2020	8	0
Northern Ireland	2021	8	0
Northern Ireland	2022	2	0
Total		62	3

Scores and results list Northern Ireland's goal tally first, score column indicates score after each Dallas goal.

List of international goals scored by Stuart Dallas
No.	Date	Venue	Cap	Opponent	Score	Result	Competition
1	31 May 2015	Gresty Road, Crewe, England	4	Qatar	1–0	1–1	Friendly
2	10 June 2017	Tofiq Bahramov Republican Stadium, Baku, Azerbaijan	22	Azerbaijan	1–0	1–0	2018 FIFA World Cup qualification
3	11 September 2018	Windsor Park, Belfast, Northern Ireland	32	Israel	2–0	3–0	Friendly

== Honours ==
Crusaders

- Irish League Cup: 2011–12
- Setanta Sports Cup: 2012

Leeds United

- EFL Championship: 2019–20

Individual

- Northern Ireland Football Writers' Association Player of the Year: 2010–11
- Northern Ireland Football Writers' Association Young Player of the Year: 2010–11
- Leeds United Player of the Year: 2020–21
- Leeds United Players' Player of the Year: 2015–16, 2019–20, 2020–21
- Leeds United Goal of the Season: 2020–21
