= Tony Diamond =

Footballer (born 1968)

Personal information
- Full name: Anthony John Diamond
- Date of birth: 23 August 1968 (age 58)
- Place of birth: Rochdale, England
- Height: 5 ft 10 in (1.78 m)
- Position: Forward

Youth career
- Blackburn Rovers

Senior career*
Years	Team	Apps	(Gls)
1986–1989	Blackburn Rovers	26	(3)
1988	→ Wigan Athletic (loan)	6	(2)
1989–1990	Blackpool	3	(1)
- Chorley
- Atherton LR

International career
1989	Northern Ireland U23	1	(0)
- * Club domestic league appearances and goals

Anthony John Diamond (born 23 August 1968) is a former professional footballer who played as a forward. Born in England, he made one appearance for the Northern Ireland U23 national team.

== Career ==
Rochdale-born Diamond started his career at Blackburn Rovers. He made his debut in September 1986 in a 6–1 win against Sunderland, and scored his first goal for the club in January 1987 in a single-goal victory over Oldham Athletic. In October 1988 he was loaned out to Wigan Athletic, and made his debut for the club in a 2–1 defeat against Southend United. He made six appearances during his spell at the club, scoring two goals.

In 1989, he represented the Northern Ireland under-23s in a 3–0 defeat against the Republic of Ireland.

He signed for Blackpool during the 1989–90 season, but made just three appearances for the club as Blackpool were relegated to the Fourth Division. He scored one goal for the Seasiders, in a 3–0 victory over Mansfield Town at Field Mill on 23 September. After being released in 1990 by incoming manager Graham Carr, Diamond dropped into non-League football.
