= Magowan =

Magowan is a surname. Notable people with the surname include:

- Alistair Magowan (born 1955), British Anglican bishop
- David Magowan (born 1983), Northern Ireland footballer
- John MaGowan (born 1941), Northern Ireland darts player
- John Hall Magowan (died 1951), British diplomat
- Kate Magowan (born 1975), English actress
- Ken Magowan (born 1981), Canadian ice hockey player
- Peter Magowan (1942–2019)
- Peter Magowan (lawyer) (1762–1810), Canadian politician
- Robert Magowan, Royal Marines Officer
- Samuel Magowan (1910–1976), Northern Ireland politician

== See also ==
- McGowan
