= 2020–21 County Antrim Shield =

Tournament details
- Country: Northern Ireland
- Teams: 16

Final positions
- Champions: Larne (1st title)
- Runners-up: Glentoran

Tournament statistics
- Matches played: 15
- Goals scored: 43 (2.87 per match)

The 2020–21 County Antrim Shield was the 132nd edition of the County Antrim Shield, a cup competition in Northern Irish football.

Larne won the tournament for the 1st time, defeating Glentoran 4–3 on penalties in the final after the match finished in a 0–0 draw.

== Results ==
=== First round ===
Team 1	Score	Team 2
Ards	2–0	Lisburn Distillery
Carrick Rangers	1–0	Newington
Cliftonville	2–1	Knockbreda
Crusaders	2–0	Harland & Wolff Welders
Dundela	3–0	Queen's University
Glentoran	2–0	Bangor
Larne	2–0	Ballyclare Comrades
Linfield	6–0	PSNI

=== Quarter-finals ===
Team 1	Score	Team 2
Carrick Rangers	0–2	Linfield
Cliftonville	7–2	Dundela
Glentoran	0–0 (5–4 p)	Ards
Larne	4–0	Crusaders

=== Semi-finals ===
Team 1	Score	Team 2
Cliftonville	0–1	Glentoran
Larne	4–1	Linfield

=== Final ===
2 December 2020

Larne	0–0	Glentoran
	Report
Penalties
D. McDaid (penalty missed); M. Donnelly (penalty scored); Robinson (penalty scored); Sule (penalty scored); Hughes (penalty scored)	4–3	(penalty scored) R. McDaid; (penalty missed) J. Donnelly; (penalty scored) Bigirimana; (penalty scored) Gallagher; (penalty missed) Crowe

Seaview, Belfast
Attendance: 0
