= Sean O'Neill (footballer) =

Irish Gaelic footballer (born 1988)

Personal information
- Date of birth: 11 April 1988 (age 38)
- Place of birth: Belfast, Northern Ireland
- Position: Goalkeeper

Team information
- Current team: Ballymena United
- Number: 1

Youth career
- 2004–2005: Glentoran

Senior career*
Years	Team	Apps	(Gls)
2005–2010	Ballymena United	18	(0)
2010–2011	Dungannon Swifts	36	(0)
2011–2022	Crusaders	247	(0)
2022	→ Ballymena United (loan)	8	(0)
2022–	Ballymena United	64	(0)

International career
2009	Northern Ireland U21	2	(0)
2009–2011	Northern Ireland U23	2	(0)
- * Club domestic league appearances and goals as of 17:45, 21 April 2024 (UTC)

Sean O'Neill (born 11 April 1988) is a Northern Irish football coach and former player. He currently is First-Team coach for NIFL Premiership club Crusaders. He also played inter-county Gaelic football for Antrim.

== Club career ==
Sean began his career at Glentoran, before moving to Ballymena United in March 2005. He spent 5 years at United, starting as back up to Alan Blayney, and then when Blayney left, O'Neill was first choice although never really established himself in the first team, making a total of 21 appearances during his time there.

He signed for Dungannon Swifts in the summer of 2010 as a replacement for Alvin Rouse, and established himself as first choice keeper, playing in 36 of 38 league games. His performances led to praise, with good displays combined with playing as goalkeeper for Antrim GAA drawing plaudits.

He signed for Crusaders in the summer of 2011, replacing outgoing keeper Chris Keenan. He ceased playing GAA not long after joining.

O'Neill became Crusaders' regular number one, until dislocating his shoulder on 12 January 2013 in an Irish Cup tie against Linfield. Although expected to be out for the rest of the season, he returned in time for the Irish Cup semi-final against Cliftonville on 6 April.

The season 2014–15 was a very successful season for O'Neill as Crusaders lifted the Gibson Cup. Due to his performances throughout the season, O'Neill was selected in the Northern Ireland Football Writers Team of the year.

On 31 January 2022, O'Neill returned to former club Ballymena United on loan for the remainder of the 2021–22 season. He re-joined the club permanently on 16 June 2022, signing a three-year contract.

== International career ==
He has represented Northern Ireland at U17, U18, U19, U21, and U23 level.

== Honours ==
Crusaders

- NIFL Premiership (3): 2014–15, 2015–16, 2017–18
- Irish Cup (1): 2018–19
- Irish League Cup (1): 2011–12
- Setanta Cup (1): 2012
- County Antrim Shield (2): 2017–18, 2018–19
