= Niall McGinn =

Northern Irish professional footballer (born 1987)

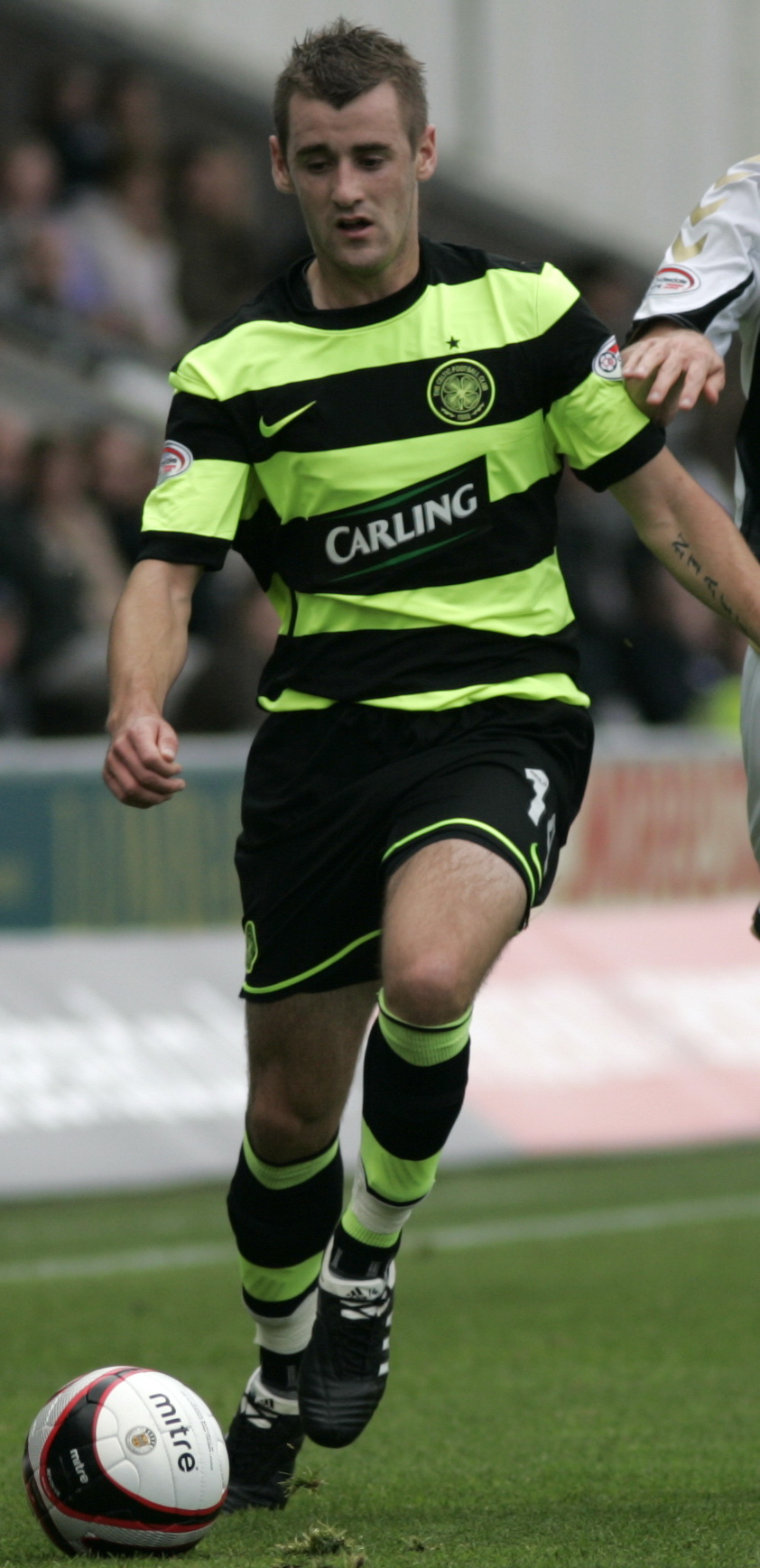
- McGinn playing for Celtic in 2009

Personal information
- Full name: Niall McGinn
- Date of birth: 20 July 1987 (age 39)
- Place of birth: Dungannon, Northern Ireland
- Height: 5 ft 10 in (1.78 m)
- Positions: Winger; striker

Team information
- Current team: Derry City (first team coach)

Youth career
- 1999–2005: Dungannon Swifts

Senior career*
Years	Team	Apps	(Gls)
2005–2008	Dungannon Swifts	42	(4)
2008–2009	Derry City	31	(6)
2009–2012	Celtic	28	(4)
2011–2012	→ Brentford (loan)	37	(5)
2012–2017	Aberdeen	179	(58)
2017	Gwangju	7	(0)
2017–2022	Aberdeen	100	(13)
2022–2023	Dundee	19	(1)
2023–2025	Glentoran	50	(14)
2024–2025	→ Greenock Morton (loan)	20	(1)
2025–2026	Peterhead	33	(2)
Total		546	(108)

International career^{‡}
2007–2008	Northern Ireland U23	2	(0)
2009	Northern Ireland B	1	(0)
2008–2022	Northern Ireland	72	(6)
- * Club domestic league appearances and goals as of 24 August 2026 ‡ National team caps and goals as of 16:42, 12 June 2022 (UTC)

Niall McGinn (born 20 July 1987) is a Northern Irish former professional footballer who played as a forward, and is currently a coach for League of Ireland Premier Division club Derry City. During his extensive playing career, McGinn has played for Dungannon Swifts, Derry City, Celtic, Brentford, Aberdeen (two spells), Gwangju, Dundee, Glentoran, Greenock Morton and Peterhead. He made his debut for Northern Ireland in 2008 and has gone on to make over seventy international appearances.

== Club career ==
=== Dungannon Swifts ===
McGinn began his football career at Dungannon Swifts in his native county. In his first full season, the club finished in 10th place.

=== Derry City ===
McGinn was signed by Derry City manager Stephen Kenny in January 2008 for an undisclosed fee from Dungannon Swifts in the Carnegie Premier League, who in turn signed him from Donaghmore Celtic. His decision to sign a professional football contract meant that McGinn retired from playing Gaelic football for Donaghmore and Tyrone under-21s. McGinn mainly plays on the left or right side of midfield but he can also be employed as a secondary striker. On 14 March 2008, McGinn made his debut for the club in a 2–1 win over Finn Harps. On 25 March 2008, McGinn scored his first goal for the club in a 4–1 win over University College Dublin. On 1 June 2008, McGinn scored his second goal in a 3–2 loss against Cork City. On 25 July 2008, McGinn scored his third goal in a 4–0 win over Galway United and scored again (fifth) in the second meeting on 2 November 2008 in a 2–0 win. On 9 August 2008, McGinn scored his fourth goal in a 3–0 win over Cobh Ramblers and scored again (sixth) in the second meeting on 14 November 2008 in a 4–2 win.

During 2008, he attracted interest from such clubs as Celtic and Championship sides Ipswich Town and Swansea City. He also attracted interest from Birmingham City.

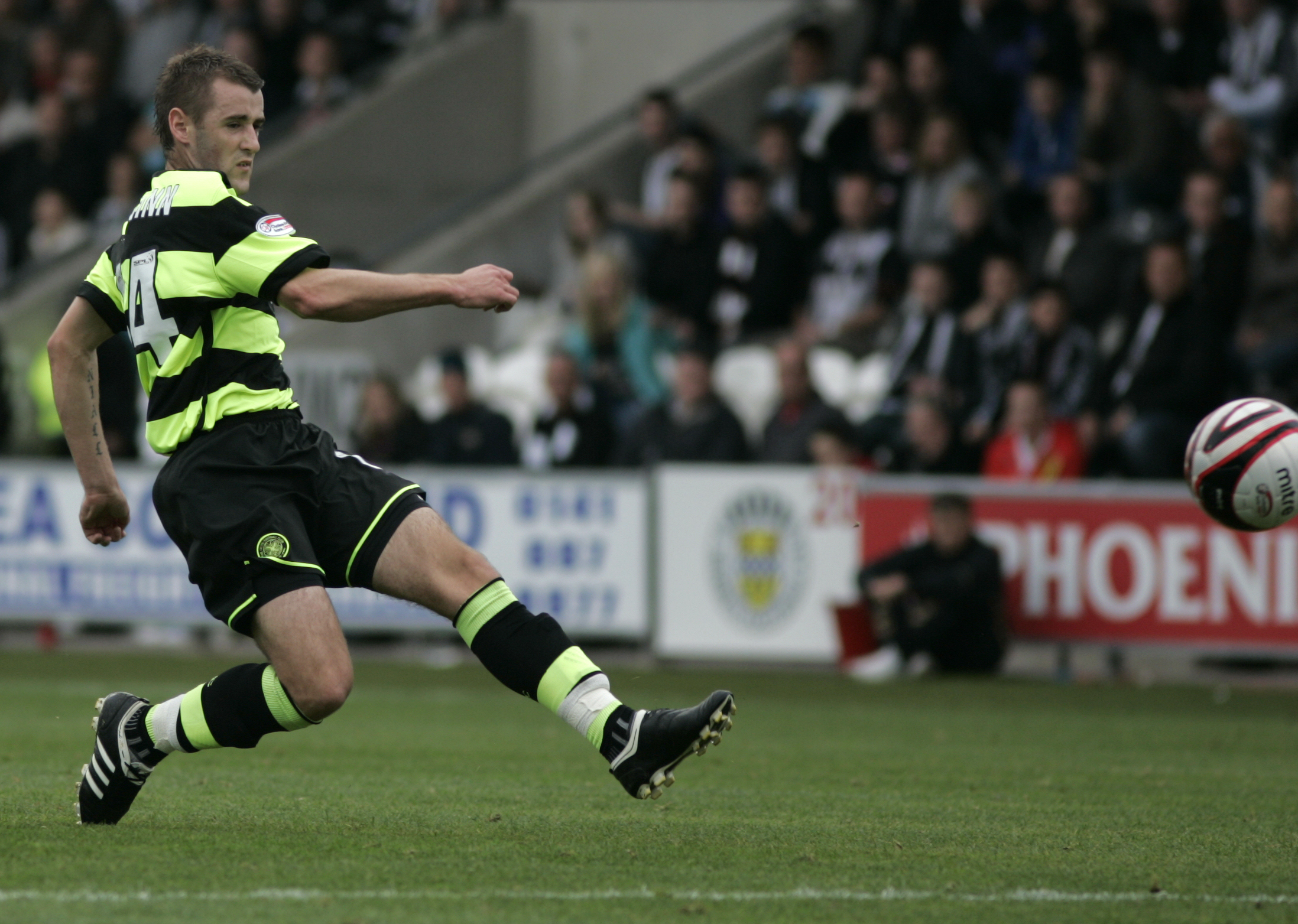
McGinn making a pass while playing for Celtic

=== Celtic ===
McGinn signed for Celtic on 1 January 2009. On 12 September 2009, McGinn made his first team debut for Celtic against Dundee United. Although the game ended in a 1–1 draw, McGinn was awarded the official Man of the Match award. On 17 September 2009, McGinn made his Europa League debut in a 2–1 loss against Hapoel Tel Aviv. In the last group stage game, with Celtic already eliminated, they faced Austrian side Rapid Wien. The match ended 3–3 which meant Celtic finished third in their group. McGinn started the match and provided an assist for Marc-Antoine Fortuné to score the second goal before being substituted for Graham Carey.

On 31 October 2009, McGinn scored his first goal for Celtic coming on as a 66th-minute substitute in a 3–0 win over Kilmarnock at Celtic Park. McGinn scored his second goal for Celtic against Hamilton Academical on 26 December 2009 by driving a right footed shot into the top corner. He scored his first goal in the Scottish Cup and his third of the 2009–10 season to put Celtic 1–0 ahead against Greenock Morton on 19 January 2010. In the January transfer window, McGinn was a transfer target for Premier League side Wigan Athletic but wished to stay at Celtic. At the end of the season, McGinn suffered an injury during the end of the last training session of the season on 17 May 2010 after breaking a metatarsal bone in his right foot and would be out for two months. After recovering from his injury, McGinn said manager Neil Lennon played a big role in helping him recover from his injury.

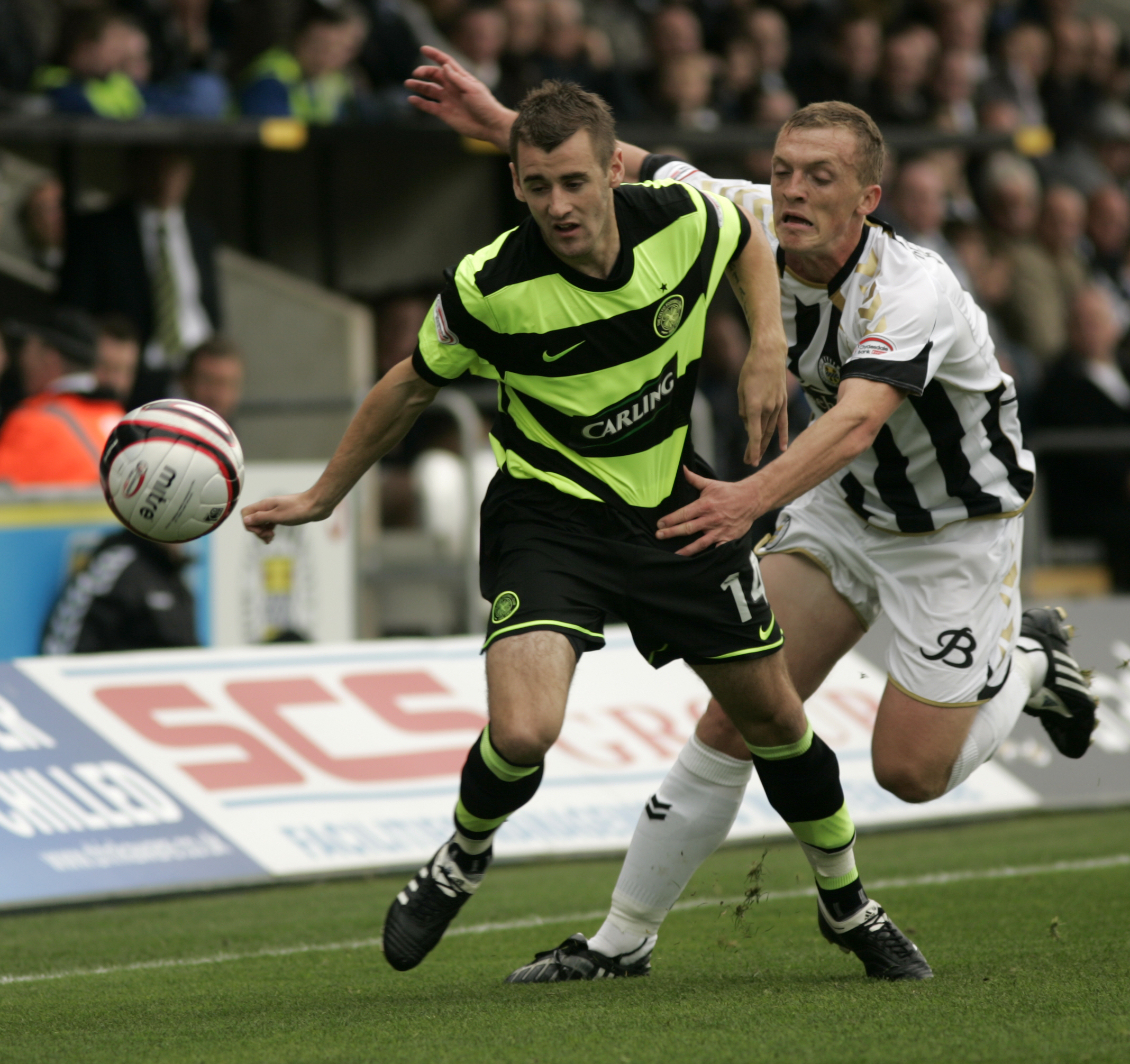
McGinn clashing with a St Mirren player with the ball

After being on the substitute's bench without coming on, McGinn scored in twice his first game of the 2010–11 season, a 3–2 win over St Johnstone in the Scottish League Cup on 27 October 2010. Three days later on 30 October 2010, he scored twice against the same opponent again but this time in the 3–2 league win. In the next match against Aberdeen (a 9–0 victory which broke the record as the biggest ever win in the SPL, as well as being the biggest ever defeat in the history of Aberdeen), McGinn provided an assist for Gary Hooper to score his second goal. Later on the season, McGinn would play less and usually be on the bench.

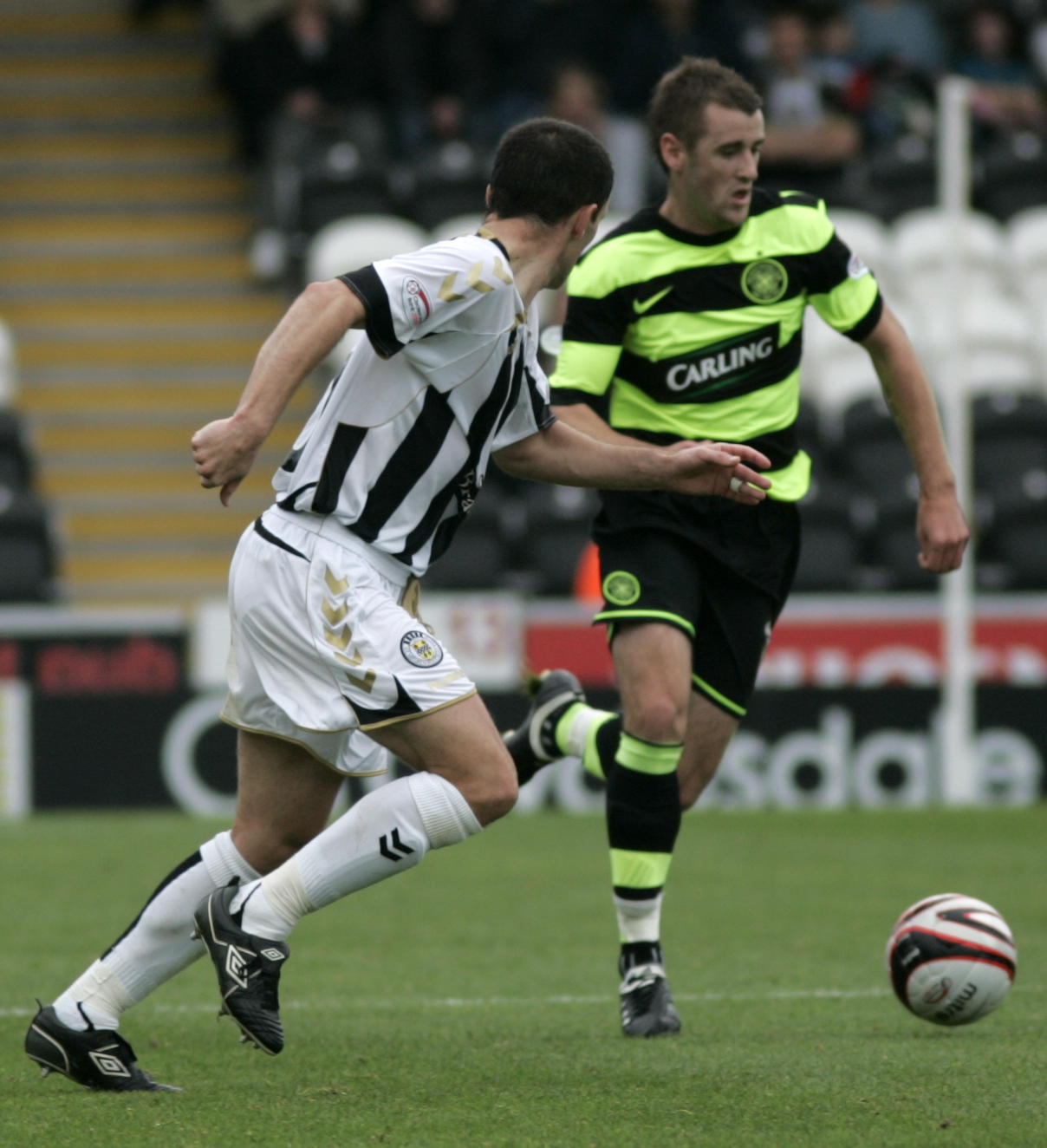
McGinn dribbling the ball

Before the start of the 2011–12 season rumours flowed that there was a fall-out between McGinn and Lennon with McGinn being unhappy over being left out of the pre-season tour of Australia. Lennon denied this and explained the leaving out of McGinn was due to his international commitments at the Nations Cup in May. McGinn signed a new one-year extension on his contract at the start of the 2011–12 season before moving to Brentford. After his loan move to Brentford, McGinn says moving to Brentford could be an end of his Celtic career after a phone-call conversation from Lennon.

==== Brentford (loan) ====
On 7 July 2011, McGinn signed for English League One club Brentford on a season long loan deal. On 6 August 2011, McGinn made his debut for the club in a 2–0 win against Yeovil Town where he made his first start before coming off in the second half. On 16 August 2011, McGinn provided an assist for Clayton Donaldson to make it 2–0 against Exeter City, only for the game to end in a 2–1 win. On 20 August 2011, McGinn scored his first goal for the club in a 5–0 win over Leyton Orient. On 17 September 2011, he scored his second goal for the club in a 2–0 win over Preston. On 10 December 2011, McGinn scored his third goal for the club in a 2–1 win over Hartlepool United. On 14 February 2012, McGinn scored his fourth goal for the club in a 2–1 loss against Colchester United. On 3 April 2012, McGinn scored his fifth goal for the club in a 2–1 win over Oldham Athletic and in the first meeting of the season, McGinn set up a goal for Myles Weston in a 2–0 win on 24 September 2011.

=== Aberdeen (first spell) ===
On 4 July 2012, McGinn signed for Scottish Premier League club Aberdeen on a two-year contract after his deal with Celtic expired. After his move, McGinn revealed the club's aim to challenge his former club Celtic and gain a place in Europe. McGinn joined up with his teammates as they headed out to Germany for a pre-season tour which included games against Werder Bremen and FC St. Pauli. He scored his first goal for the Dons in the friendly against St. Pauli, rounding the goalkeeper after picking up the ball from a poor back pass.

He went on to make his competitive debut for Aberdeen in an opening day 1–0 defeat away to SPL champions Celtic. The following weekend, he made his home debut against newly promoted side Ross County. The game finished 0–0 and also saw McGinn stretchered off towards the end of the game after an accidental collision with veteran defender Grant Munro. Manager Craig Brown spoke after the game, ruling McGinn out of the Northern Ireland squad that was due to face Finland on 14 August. The former Scotland manager said: "We can't tell the length of the recovery period but he will certainly be out in the immediate future."

After being out for four weeks due to an ankle injury, McGinn featured as a substitute in a 1–1 draw with Inverness Caledonian thistle. The next week he came on as a substitute against Motherwell and scored his first competitive goal for the club, helping Aberdeen come back from 1–3 down to draw 3–3. He then went on to score in his next two appearances for the Dons. A 2–1 victory at home to Hibernian and helped the Dons come back to beat Kilmarnock 3–1 at Rugby Park. A fortnight later, he scored his thirtieth goal in four matches at Tannadice in a 1–1 draw with Dundee United. On 27 October 2012, McGinn became the first Aberdeen player in twenty years to score in five successive league matches, netting the opening goal in a 2–0 win over Dundee. The following week, in a 2–1 loss to Ross County in Dingwall, McGinn scored in his sixth straight league match, breaking Duncan Shearer's record. McGinn headed a late equaliser in a Scottish Cup tie with Motherwell to level the match and set up a replay at Fir Park.

McGinn then bagged the first hat-trick in his professional career in a convincing 3–1 victory over Dundee at Dens Park, on 29 December 2012; this brought his goal tally to 14 before the turn of the year. He scored a free kick in a 2–2 draw with Dundee United at Pittodrie three days later, his 14th goal in 19 league games. On the last day of the transfer window, McGinn revealed he offers from three clubs in England's Championship which he rebuffed, to return the faith shown in him by Craig Brown. Later in the 2012–13 season, McGinn's impressive display earned him a nomination for PFA Scotland Players' Player of the Year.

On 3 May 2013, McGinn was awarded both Aberdeen Player of the Year and Aberdeen Players' Player of the Year for the 2012–13 season. On picking up the awards, he said: "The fans have been unbelievable towards me and I am very thankful to them for that. To win the award voted for by the fans means that you are doing something right on the park. Thank you to everyone that took the time to vote for me". McGinn finished the season with 21 goals in all competitions, 20 of those coming in league matches. On 17 May, McGinn signed a two-year extension to his current contract, tying him to the club until 2016. After signing the new contract, he insisted that he had unfinished business to do by winning trophies for the club. At the end of the 2012–13 season, McGinn finished with 21 goals in thirty-nine appearances in all competitions.

In 2013–14 season, McGinn scored his first goals of the campaign in a 3–1 win over Motherwell, followed up his third goal, in a 2–1 loss against Hearts. However, he soon sustained an ankle injury during an international game that cause him to miss two games. McGinn then came into goalscoring form with five goals in four games, against Partick Thistle, Hearts, Celtic and St Johnstone. I the second part of 2013–14, McGinn would play a vital role when he provided a double assist in a 2–1 win over Celtic, giving the Glasgow club their first defeat of the season. A few weeks later, McGinn played the full 120 minutes of normal plus extra time in the Scottish League Cup final against Inverness Caledonian Thistle which Aberdeen won 4–2 on penalty kicks. He scored his first league goal in three months, as Aberdeen drew 1–1 with Dundee United. McGinn scored twice on 30 March 2014 in a 2–0 win over Hibernian. He finished 2013–14 season as the top scorer for the second time in a row with thirteen goals in all competitions.

In 2014–15, McGinn scored two goals in the Europa League Qualifiers in a 5–0 win over Daugava Rīga in the first leg of the tie, following up with his second in a 2–1 win over FC Groningen. On 30 August 2014, McGinn's first domestic goal of the season came in a 1–0 win over Partick Thistle. On 22 December, McGinn signed a contract extension, staying with the Dons until Summer 2017.

In the 2016–17 season, McGinn and Aberdeen finished as runners-up in all three domestic competitions, losing out to his former club Celtic in all of them.

=== Gwangju ===
In June 2017, Gwangju FC's Director of football Ki Young-ok, father of former Celtic midfielder Ki Sung-yueng, made McGinn an offer to join the club. On 4 July, McGinn joined Gwangju as the K League's first player from the United Kingdom. McGinn struggled to settle in Korea, and it was mutually agreed to end his contract in November 2017.

=== Aberdeen (second spell) ===
Despite receiving offers from Hearts and Hibernian, on 28 December 2017, McGinn resigned for Aberdeen on a three-and-a-half-year contract, officially rejoining the club on 1 January 2018. He again finished on the losing side to his former employers when Celtic defeated Aberdeen 1–0 in the 2018 Scottish League Cup final, having also finished in second position behind them in the 2017–18 Scottish Premiership.

=== Dundee ===
On 24 January 2022, McGinn joined Scottish Premiership side Dundee on an 18-month deal. McGinn made his debut 2 days later as a substitute against St Johnstone. McGinn would score his first goal for Dundee in the Scottish Cup against Peterhead. His first league goal for the Dee would come in a 3–1 home victory over Hibernian.

McGinn would score Dundee's opening competitive goal for the 2022–23 season in a win over Hamilton Academical in the Scottish League Cup. After having been frozen out of the squad, McGinn would leave Dundee by mutual consent on 9 January 2023.

=== Glentoran ===
On the same day as his departure from Dundee, McGinn would return to his native Northern Ireland and sign with NIFL Premiership club Glentoran.

On 1 December 2023, McGinn would receive praise for being involved in all the goals in a 4–0 win over Glentoran's bitter rivals Linfield.

==== Greenock Morton (loan) ====
On 31 August 2024, McGinn returned to Scotland with Scottish Championship club Greenock Morton on loan until the end of the season. He made his debut for the Ton on the same day, coming off the bench in a league game at home to Falkirk. On 26 February 2025, McGinn scored his first goal for Morton in an away league defeat against Livingston. At the end of the season, McGinn's parent club Glentoran confirmed that he would leave them upon the expiration of his contract.

=== Peterhead (player-coach) ===
On 6 July 2025, McGinn joined Scottish League One club Peterhead on a one-year deal. On 12 August, McGinn scored his first pair of goals for Peterhead in a Scottish Challenge Cup win over Aberdeen U21. On 12 May 2026, Peterhead announced that McGinn would take up the role of first team coach alongside his playing duties.

=== Derry City (first team coach) ===
In August 2026, McGinn returned to his former club Derry City in a solely coaching capacity as part of interim manager Mark Connolly's backroom staff.

== International career ==
McGinn's performances for Derry City led to him featuring in the Northern Ireland under-23 team.

In November 2008, McGinn received his first call-up to the Northern Ireland senior squad by manager Nigel Worthington for the series of international friendlies and he gained his first cap coming on as a substitute against Hungary on 19 November. He was the first Derry City player to play for the senior Northern Ireland team in 19 years. Although disappointed in the result, Nigel Worthington is quoted as saying of McGinn:

He was the one bright spark in our side. He did what he is good at – he kept it simple. He ran at players when he had the opportunity and was not afraid.

McGinn again impressed when called up to the senior squad for the friendly against Israel at Windsor Park on 12 August 2009. The match ended 1–1, and McGinn came on as a second-half substitute. Again, his individual performance was praised by manager Nigel Worthington:

Niall McGinn did terrifically well – he got us up the pitch and used his pace and ability.

McGinn scored his first international goal in a draw against Portugal in a FIFA World Cup 2014 Qualifier on 16 October 2012. His second goal was the winning goal in a UEFA Euro 2016 qualifier, during Northern Ireland's first competitive away victory since September 2010, beating Hungary 2–1. He scored his third goal at the 2016 Euro Championship in a 2–0 win over Ukraine. He stated later, "What a night and what an occasion. To come off the bench and to score as well was just unbelievable for me." It was in a match that saw the team win for the first time at the European finals, and was the latest ever goal at the tournament, coming in the 96th minute.

On 15 November 2016, McGinn won his 50th cap for Northern Ireland, as they played Croatia in a friendly, being named as captain for the match.

== Style of play ==
Upon his signing for Brentford, McGinn's new manager Uwe Rösler said that, "Niall is a quick, very direct player and has a very good work ethic."

== Awards ==
McGinn's fine season with Derry City in 2008 was publicly recognised when he won the 2008 PFAI Young Player of the Year award.

In January 2010 McGinn was awarded the George Best Breakthrough Award for 2009 in recognition of his impressive performances for club and country.

On 6 November 2012, it was announced that Aberdeen had scooped a hat-trick of awards for the month of October. Manager Craig Brown took Manager of the Month, McGinn took Player of the Month and midfielder Ryan Fraser took the award for Young Player of the Month.

== Personal life ==
In January 2011, it was reported that the Royal Mail had intercepted packages sent by loyalists containing bullets addressed to McGinn, Paddy McCourt and Celtic manager Neil Lennon. McGinn and McCourt were both shocked and disappointed to be subjected to such threats.

== Career statistics ==
=== Club ===
As of match played 1 August 2026

Club	Season	League			Cup		League Cup		Other		Total	
Club	Season	Division	Apps	Goals	Apps	Goals	Apps	Goals	Apps	Goals	Apps	Goals
Dungannon Swifts	2005–06	Irish Premier League	1	0	—		—		—		1	0
Dungannon Swifts	2006–07	Irish Premier League	23	0	—		—		—		23	0
Dungannon Swifts	2007–08	Irish Premier League	18	4	—		—		—		18	4
Dungannon Swifts	Total		42	4	0	0	0	0	0	0	42	4
Derry City	2008	League of Ireland Premier Division	31	6	13	4	—		—		44	10
Celtic	2009–10	Scottish Premier League	14	2	1	1	1	0	5 (Note: Appearances in the UEFA Europa League)	0	21	3
Celtic	2010–11	Scottish Premier League	14	2	0	0	1	1	0	0	15	3
Celtic	Total		28	4	1	1	2	1	5	0	36	6
Brentford (loan)	2011–12	League One	37	5	2	0	0	0	2 (Note: Appearances in the Football League Trophy)	0	41	5
Aberdeen	2012–13	Scottish Premier League	35	20	3	1	2	0	0	0	40	21
Aberdeen	2013–14	Scottish Premiership	36	13	4	1	4	0	0	0	44	14
Aberdeen	2014–15	Scottish Premiership	36	5	1	0	2	0	6	2	45	7
Aberdeen	2015–16	Scottish Premiership	36	10	1	0	1	0	6	2	44	12
Aberdeen	2016–17	Scottish Premiership	36	10	5	2	4	1	5	1	50	14
Aberdeen	Total		179	58	14	4	13	1	17	5	223	68
Gwangju FC	2017	K League Classic	7	0	1	0	0	0	0	0	8	0
Aberdeen	2017–18	Scottish Premiership	11	2	5	0	0	0	0	0	16	2
Aberdeen	2018–19	Scottish Premiership	27	5	5	3	3	0	2	0	37	8
Aberdeen	2019–20	Scottish Premiership	28	6	5	0	2	0	6	1	41	8
Aberdeen	2020–21	Scottish Premiership	25	0	3	1	1	1	1	0	30	2
Aberdeen	2021–22	Scottish Premiership	9	0	0	0	1	0	1	0	11	0
Aberdeen	Total		100	13	18	4	7	1	10	1	135	19
Dundee	2021–22	Scottish Premiership	15	1	2	1	0	0	0	0	17	2
Dundee	2022–23	Scottish Championship	4	0	0	0	5	2	0	0	9	2
Dundee	Total		19	1	2	1	5	2	0	0	26	4
Glentoran	2022–23	NIFL Premiership	17	8	1	1	0	0	2 (Note: Appearances in the NIFL Premiership Europa Conference League play-offs)	0	20	9
Glentoran	2023–24	NIFL Premiership	26	5	3	1	2	0	6 (Note: Two appearances in the UEFA Europa Conference League, three appearances in the County Antrim Shield, and one appearance in the NIFL Premiership Conference League play-offs)	0	37	6
Glentoran	2024–25	NIFL Premiership	4	1	0	0	0	0	0	0	4	1
Glentoran	Total		47	14	4	2	2	0	8	0	61	16
Greenock Morton (loan)	2024–25	Scottish Championship	20	1	1	0	0	0	3 (Note: Appearances in the Scottish Challenge Cup)	0	24	1
Peterhead	2025–26	Scottish League One	32	2	1	1	4	0	7	2	44	5
Peterhead	2026–27	Scottish League One	1	0	0	0	4	1	0	0	5	1
Peterhead	Total		33	2	1	1	8	1	7	2	49	6
Career total			543	108	57	17	37	6	52	8	689	139

=== International ===
As of match played 12 June 2022

National team	Year	Apps	Goals
Northern Ireland	2008	1	0
Northern Ireland	2009	5	0
Northern Ireland	2010	4	0
Northern Ireland	2011	7	0
Northern Ireland	2012	3	1
Northern Ireland	2013	8	0
Northern Ireland	2014	6	1
Northern Ireland	2015	6	0
Northern Ireland	2016	10	1
Northern Ireland	2017	3	0
Northern Ireland	2018	2	0
Northern Ireland	2019	5	1
Northern Ireland	2020	2	1
Northern Ireland	2021	5	1
Northern Ireland	2022	5	0
Total		72	6

Scores and results list Northern Ireland's goal tally first.

No.	Date	Venue	Opponent	Score	Result	Competition
1.	16 October 2012	Estádio do Dragão, Porto, Portugal	Portugal	1–0	1–1	2014 FIFA World Cup qualification
2.	7 September 2014	Groupama Arena, Budapest, Hungary	Hungary	1–1	2–1	UEFA Euro 2016 qualification
3.	16 June 2016	Parc Olympique Lyonnais, Lyon, France	Ukraine	2–0	2–0	UEFA Euro 2016
4.	21 March 2019	Windsor Park, Belfast, Northern Ireland	Estonia	1–0	2–0	UEFA Euro 2020 qualification
5.	8 October 2020	Stadion Grbavica, Sarajevo, Bosnia and Herzegovina	Bosnia and Herzegovina	1–1	1–1 (4–3 p)	UEFA Euro 2020 qualification play-offs
6.	28 March 2021	Windsor Park, Belfast, Northern Ireland	United States	1–2	1–2	Friendly

== Honours ==
=== Club ===
Derry City

- League of Ireland Cup: 2008

Celtic

- Scottish Cup: 2010–11

Aberdeen

- Scottish League Cup: 2013–14; runner-up 2016–17 2018–19
- Scottish Cup runner-up: 2016–17

=== Individual ===
- PFAI Young Player of the Year: 2008
- Aberdeen FC Player of the Year: 2013
- SPL Player of the Month: October 2012
- Scottish Premiership Player of the Month: September 2015
- Most assists in the Scottish Premiership: 2015–16
