= 2012 Setanta Sports Cup =

Tournament details
- Country: Northern Ireland; Republic of Ireland
- Teams: 12

Final positions
- Champions: Crusaders (1st title)
- Runners-up: Derry City

Tournament statistics
- Matches played: 21
- Goals scored: 52 (2.48 per match)

The 2012 Setanta Sports Cup was the seventh staging of the Setanta Sports Cup, an annual association football competition featuring clubs from Northern Ireland and the Republic of Ireland. It commenced on 11 February 2012 and ended on 12 May 2012, with the final played at The Oval, Belfast.

The draw for the 2012 competition was made at Aviva Stadium, Dublin, on 25 January 2012.

Crusaders won the competition for the first time, defeating Derry City 5–4 on penalties after the scores were level at 2–2 after extra time. It was the first time a club from the Northern Irish IFA Premiership had won the cup since Linfield won the inaugural competition in 2005.

== First round ==
Four League of Ireland and four IFA Premiership teams played each other in the first round over two games with the winners qualifying for the quarter-finals. The first legs were played on 11 and 13 February and the second legs were played on 20 February.

Team 1	Agg.	Team 2	1st leg	2nd leg
Bray Wanderers (Republic of Ireland)	2−7	(Northern Ireland) Glentoran	2−4	0−3
Lisburn Distillery (Northern Ireland)	0−7	(Republic of Ireland) Derry City	0−4	0−3
Bohemians (Republic of Ireland)	3−1	(Northern Ireland) Portadown	2−1	1−0
Cliftonville (Northern Ireland)	2−0	(Republic of Ireland) St Patrick's Athletic	1−0	1−0

=== First leg ===
11 February 2012
15:00

Bray Wanderers	2 − 4	Glentoran
Waters 18', 42'	Report	Murray 19'; Knight 51', 88'; O'Hanlon 60'

Carlisle Grounds, Bray
Attendance: 650
Referee: Alan Kelly, (Cork)

11 February 2012
15:00

Lisburn Distillery	0 − 4	Derry City
Cushley (red card) 62'	Report	McLaughlin 23'; Patterson 28', 51', 60'

New Grosvenor Stadium, Ballyskeagh
Referee: M.Smith (Belfast)

13 February 2012
19:15

Bohemians	2 − 1	Portadown
Corcoran 45'; Moore 58'	Report	Braniff 61'

Dalymount Park, Dublin
Referee: Tomás Connolly (Dublin)

13 February 2012
19:45

Cliftonville	1 − 0	St Patrick's Athletic
Boyce 48'	Report

Solitude, Belfast
Attendance: 600
Referee: Raymond Hetherington

=== Second leg ===
20 February 2012
19.15

St Patrick's Athletic	0 − 1	Cliftonville
Russell (red card) 65'	(Report)	Gormley 69'

Richmond Park, Dublin

Cliftonville won 2 − 0 on aggregate

20 February 2012
19.45

Derry City	3 − 0	Lisburn Distillery
McEleney 25'; McLaughlin 60'; Patterson 63'	(Report)

The Brandywell, Derry

Derry City won 7 − 0 on aggregate

20 February 2012
19.45

Portadown	0 − 1	Bohemians
	(Report)	Martin 86'

Shamrock Park, Portadown

Bohemians won 3 − 1 on aggregate

20 February 2012
19.45

Glentoran	3 − 0	Bray Wanderers
Boyce 11', 75' (pen.); Nixon 45'	(Report)

The Oval, Belfast

Glentoran won 7 − 2 on aggregate

== Quarter-finals ==
The winners of the four first-round games joined the four seeded teams (Shamrock Rovers, Sligo Rovers, Crusaders, and Linfield) who received byes into the quarter-finals. The first legs were played on 5 March 2012 and the second legs were played on 20 March 2012. The draw for the quarter-finals was made on 20 February 2012.

Team 1	Agg.	Team 2	1st leg	2nd leg
Crusaders (Northern Ireland)	2−0	(Republic of Ireland) Bohemians	0−0	2−0
Linfield (Northern Ireland)	2−4	(Republic of Ireland) Derry City	1−1	1−3
Shamrock Rovers (Republic of Ireland)	2−2	(Northern Ireland) Cliftonville	2−0	0−2
Sligo Rovers (Republic of Ireland)	3−1	(Northern Ireland) Glentoran	2−0	1−1

=== First leg ===
5 March 2012
19:30

Linfield	1 – 1	Derry City
Thompson 13'	(Report)	McDaid 85'

Windsor Park, Belfast

5 March 2012
19:45

Sligo Rovers	2 – 0	Glentoran
Boco 37'; Quigley 63'	(Report)	Nixon (red card) 84'

Showgrounds, Sligo

5 March 2012
19:45

Crusaders	0 – 0	Bohemians
	(Report)

Seaview, Belfast

5 March 2012
19:45

Shamrock Rovers	2 – 0	Cliftonville
Dennehy 12'; Hawkins 71'	(Report)

Tallaght Stadium, Dublin

=== Second leg ===
20 March 2012
19:45

Bohemians	0 – 2	Crusaders
Pender (red card) 90'	(Report)	Caddell 3'; McMaster 36'

Dalymount Park, Dublin

Crusaders won 2 − 0 on aggregate

20 March 2012
19:45

Cliftonville	2 – 0 (a.e.t.)	Shamrock Rovers
Johnston 45'; Gormley 86'	(Report)
Penalties
Gormley (penalty scored); Caldwell (penalty missed); Donnelly (penalty missed); O'Carroll (penalty missed)	1 – 3	(penalty scored) Dennehy; (penalty scored) Turner; (penalty scored) Gartland

Solitude, Belfast

Shamrock Rovers won 3 – 1 on penalties after 2 – 2 draw on aggregate

20 March 2012
19:45

Derry City	3 – 1	Linfield
Molloy 69'; McLaughlin 77'; Madden 90'	(Report)	Lowry 31'

The Brandywell, Derry

Derry City won 4 − 2 on aggregate

20 March 2012
19:45

Glentoran	1 − 1	Sligo Rovers
Ward 23'	(Report)	North 89' (pen.)

The Oval, Belfast

Sligo Rovers won 3 − 1 on aggregate

== Semi-finals ==
The draw for the semi-finals was made following the second leg quarter-final matches.

Team 1	Agg.	Team 2	1st leg	2nd leg
Crusaders (Northern Ireland)	3−2	(Republic of Ireland) Sligo Rovers	2−0	1−2
Shamrock Rovers (Republic of Ireland)	2−3	(Republic of Ireland) Derry City	0−3	2−0

=== First leg ===
16 April 2012
19:45

Crusaders	2 – 0	Sligo Rovers
Rainey 40', 80'	(Report)

Seaview, Belfast

16 April 2012
19:45

Shamrock Rovers	0 – 3	Derry City
Pieterse (red card) 12'	(Report)	Deery 15'; McEleney 51'; McBride 85'

Tallaght Stadium, Dublin

=== Second leg ===
23 April 2012
20:00

Sligo Rovers	2 – 1 (a.e.t.)	Crusaders
Boco 35'; Quigley 48'	(Report)	Coates 105' (pen.)

Showgrounds, Sligo

Crusaders won 3 − 2 on aggregate

23 April 2012
19:45

Derry City	0 – 2	Shamrock Rovers
	(Report)	Twigg 52', 86'

The Brandywell, Derry

Derry City won 3 − 2 on aggregate

== Final ==
12 May 2012
16:00

Crusaders	2 – 2 (a.e.t.)	Derry City
Coates 85', 96'; McBride (red card) 90'	(Report)	Patterson 80', 101' (pen.)
Penalties
Coates (penalty scored); Morrow (penalty scored); Snoddy (penalty scored); Gargan (penalty missed); Dallas (penalty scored); McKeown (penalty scored)	5 – 4	(penalty scored) Patterson; (penalty scored) Higgins; (penalty scored) Molloy; (penalty missed) Morrison; (penalty scored) McEleney; (penalty missed) McCaffrey

The Oval, Belfast
Attendance: 3,275
Referee: Raymond Crangle

Winner of 2012 Setanta Sports Cup
(Northern Ireland) Crusaders
1st title

== Goalscorers ==
6 goals

- (Northern Ireland) Rory Patterson (Derry City)

3 goals

- (Republic of Ireland) Stephen McLaughlin (Derry City)
- (Northern Ireland) Colin Coates (Crusaders)

2 goals

- (Benin) Romauld Boco (Sligo Rovers)
- (Northern Ireland) Darren Boyce (Glentoran)
- (Northern Ireland) Joe Gormley (Cliftonville)
- (England) Leon Knight (Glentoran)
- (Republic of Ireland) Patrick McEleney (Derry City)
- (Republic of Ireland) Mark Quigley (Sligo Rovers)
- (Northern Ireland) David Rainey (Crusaders)
- (Republic of Ireland) Gary Twigg (Shamrock Rovers)
- (Republic of Ireland) Kieran Waters (Bray Wanderers)

1 goal

- (Northern Ireland) Liam Boyce (Cliftonville)
- (Northern Ireland) Kevin Braniff (Portadown)
- (Northern Ireland) Declan Caddell (Crusaders)
- (Republic of Ireland) Daniel Corcoran (Bohemians)
- (Republic of Ireland) Billy Dennehy (Shamrock Rovers)
- (Republic of Ireland) Kevin Deery (Derry City)
- (Republic of Ireland) Colin Hawkins (Shamrock Rovers)
- (Republic of Ireland) Barry Johnston (Cliftonville)
- (Northern Ireland) Philip Lowry (Linfield)
- (Republic of Ireland) Simon Madden (Derry City)
- (England) Adam Martin (Bohemians)
- (Republic of Ireland) Ryan McBride (Derry City)
- (Northern Ireland) David McDaid (Derry City)
- (Northern Ireland) David McMaster (Crusaders)
- (Northern Ireland) Barry Molloy (Derry City)
- (Republic of Ireland) Karl Moore (Bohemians)
- (Northern Ireland) Martin Murray (Glentoran)
- (Northern Ireland) Colin Nixon (Glentoran)
- (England) Danny North (Sligo Rovers)
- (Northern Ireland) Jim O'Hanlon (Glentoran)
- (Northern Ireland) Peter Thompson (Linfield)
- (Northern Ireland) Sean Ward (Glentoran)
