= 2011 League of Ireland Cup final =

- Event: 2011 League of Ireland Cup
Cork City	Derry City
0	1
- Date: 24 September 2011
- Venue: Turners Cross, Cork
- Man of the Match: Davin O'Neill (Cork City)
- Referee: Paul Tuite (Dublin)
- Attendance: 4,164

The 2011 League of Ireland Cup final also known as the 2011 EA Sports Cup Final was the final match of the 2011 League of Ireland Cup, the 38th season of the League of Ireland Cup, a football competition for the 27 teams from the Premier Division, First Division, A Championship and the Ulster Senior League. The match was contested by Cork City and Derry City, at Turners Cross in Cork on 24 September 2011. It was broadcast live on Setanta Sports.

== Route to the final ==
=== Cork City ===
Date	Home Team	Score	Away Team	Venue

25 April 2011 Second Round	Wexford Youths	0–1	Cork City	Ferrycarrig Park
18:00		Report	Stephen Mulcahy 55'; Danny Murphy (red card) 87'	Attendance: 200

6 June 2011 Quarter-Finals	Cork City	2–1	St. Patrick's Athletic	Turners Cross
15:00	Derek O'Brien 19'; Graham Cummins 71'	Report	Neil Harney 57'	Attendance: 1077

8 August 2011 Semi-Final	Cork City	3–1 (a.e.t.)	Limerick	Turners Cross
19:45	Davin O'Neill 28' (pen.); Vincent Escudé-Candau 103' (pen.); Graham Cummins 118'	Report	Peter Hynes 13'	Attendance: 2059

=== Derry City ===
Date	Home Team	Score	Away Team	Venue

28 March 2011 First Round	Salthill Devon	2–4 (a.e.t.)	Derry City	Drom Clubhouse
19:45	Etanda Nkololo 35'; Victor Collins 59'	Report	James McClean 55'; Emmet Friars 75'; Ryan McBride 112'; Gareth McGlynn 114'

25 April 2011 Second Round	Derry City	2–1	Mervue United	Brandywell Stadium
15:00	David McDaid 7'; Michael McCrudden 56'	Report	Alex Lee 92'

27 June 2011 Quarter-Finals	UCD	0–3	Derry City	UCD Bowl
19:45	Sean Harding (red card) 74'	Report	Stephen McLaughlin 48'; Ruairí Harkin 58'; Michael McCrudden 62'	Attendance: 200

23 August 2011 Semi-Final	Derry City	3–3 (a.e.t.) (5–3 p)	Sligo Rovers	Brandywell Stadium
	Daniel Lafferty 33', (red card) 90'; Stephen McLaughlin 76', 93'	Report	Danny Ventre 45'; Eoin Doyle 80', 108'	Attendance: 1200
	Penalties
	Emmet Friars (penalty scored); Ruaidhri Higgins (penalty scored); Owen Morrison (penalty scored); Ruairí Harkin (penalty scored); Stephen McLaughlin (penalty scored)		Joseph Ndo (penalty scored); Eoin Doyle (penalty scored); Richie Ryan (penalty missed); Alan Kirby (penalty scored)

== Final ==
=== Summary ===
The final was played on 24 September 2011 at Cork's Turners Cross. Derry City defeated Cork City 1-0, thanks to a penalty scored by Éamon Zayed. This was Derry City's record 10th League of Ireland Cup.

=== Details ===
24 September 2011
18:00 IST

Cork City	0–1	Derry City
	Report	Éamon Zayed 67' (pen.); Shane McEleney (red card) 92'

Turners Cross, Cork
Attendance: 4,164
Referee: Paul Tuite (Dublin)

Cork City	Derry City

CORK CITY:
GK	1	(Republic of Ireland) Mark McNulty
RB	21	(Republic of Ireland) Gavin Kavanagh
CB	22	(Republic of Ireland) Neal Horgan	(substituted off) 84'
CB	3	(Republic of Ireland) Danny Murphy
LB	18	(Republic of Ireland) Kalen Spillane
RM	6	(Republic of Ireland) Gearóid Morrissey
CM	8	(Republic of Ireland) Shane Duggan
CM	11	(Republic of Ireland) Derek O’Brien	(substituted off) 77'
LM	2	(Republic of Ireland) Ian Turner	(substituted off) 77'
CF	9	(Republic of Ireland) Graham Cummins
CF	7	(Republic of Ireland) Davin O'Neill
Substitutes:
GK	16	(Republic of Ireland) James McCarthy
DF	14	(Republic of Ireland) Craig Burns
MF	24	(France) Vincent Escudé-Candau	(substituted on) 77'
FW	10	(Republic of Ireland) Vinny Sullivan	(substituted on) 77'
FW	15	(Republic of Ireland) Danny Morrissey	(substituted on) 84'
FW	19	(Republic of Ireland) Cathal Lordan
FW	20	(Republic of Ireland) Jamie Murphy
Manager:
(Republic of Ireland) Tommy Dunne

DERRY CITY:
GK	1	(Republic of Ireland) Gerard Doherty
RB	3	(Northern Ireland) Emmet Friars
CB	5	(Scotland) Stewart Greacen
LB	12	(Republic of Ireland) Ryan McBride
RM	8	(Republic of Ireland) Kevin Deery
CM	16	(Northern Ireland) Ruaidhri Higgins
CM	14	(Republic of Ireland) Gareth McGlynn
LM	4	(Republic of Ireland) Barry Molloy
CF	15	(Republic of Ireland) Stephen McLaughlin
CF	17	(Libya) Éamon Zayed
CF	9	(Northern Ireland) David McDaid	(substituted off) 54'
Substitutes:
GK	22	(Republic of Ireland) Eugene Ferry
DF	6	(Republic of Ireland) Shane McEleney
DF	26	(Republic of Ireland) Thomas McMonagle
MF	7	(Republic of Ireland) Ruairí Harkin
MF	25	(Republic of Ireland) James Henry
FW	10	(Republic of Ireland) Patrick McEleney	(substituted on) 54'
FW	18	(Republic of Ireland) Mark Farren
Manager:
(Republic of Ireland) Stephen Kenny
