= 2011 Nations Cup =

Tournament details
- Host country: Republic of Ireland
- City: Dublin
- Dates: 8 February – 29 May 2011
- Teams: 4
- Venue: Aviva Stadium

Final positions
- Champions: Republic of Ireland
- Runners-up: Scotland
- Third place: Wales
- Fourth place: Northern Ireland

Tournament statistics
- Matches played: 6
- Goals scored: 18 (3 per match)
- Attendance: 74,867 (12,478 per match)
- Top scorer: (Republic of Ireland) Robbie Keane (3)

The 2011 Nations Cup (also known as the Carling Nations Cup after its headline sponsor) was a round-robin football tournament between the Northern Ireland, Republic of Ireland, Scotland, and Wales national teams. The first set of two games were played in Dublin in February, with the remaining four games played in May 2011. It was won by the Republic of Ireland, who won all three of their games without conceding a goal.

== History ==
The first international association football match was played between England and Scotland, two of the Home Nations of the United Kingdom, in 1872. The remaining two Home Nations, Wales and Ireland both played their first matches within the following decade, in 1876 and 1882 respectively. The first meetings between the sides were friendlies until they were organised to form the British Home Championship, the first international football tournament, for the 1883–84 season. The competition continued for 100 years, although it was not held during the First or Second World War, before being abolished in 1984 due to claims of fading interest and low crowds.

Calls for the return of the a competition between the Home Nations had been sporadically raised since the end of the British Home Championship with varying degrees of success, but the idea gained widespread attention in 2006 when Northern Ireland manager Lawrie Sanchez called for its return. In 2007, the national football associations of Scotland, Wales, Northern Ireland and the Republic of Ireland met with Wales raising a proposal to revive a Home Nations tournament in the form of a "Celtic Cup" in response to the failure of any British side to qualify for UEFA Euro 2008. However, the plan was ultimately delayed due to fixture congestion with 2010 FIFA World Cup qualifying fixtures already being in place. The competition was officially announced in September the following year with the tournament scheduled to be held in Dublin between February and May 2011. England chose to turn down the chance to take part in the competition citing fixture congestion. The Football Association of Wales stated its belief in 2007 that England might have joined at a later date if they could have been convinced that there were "practical solutions" to problems like fixture congestion.

It was announced on 12 August 2010, that the tournament would be sponsored by brewing company Carling, and known for sponsorship reasons as the Carling Nations Cup. A second tournament was provisionally scheduled to take place in Wales in 2013.

The 2011 Nations Cup began in February 2011 at the Aviva Stadium in Dublin. The Republic of Ireland won the inaugural tournament after winning all three of their matches, culminating with a 1–0 win over Scotland on the final matchday. It was originally intended to be a biennial tournament, but poor attendance at the first tournament meant that it was discontinued.

== Format ==
The Nations Cup plan initially proposed the tournament would be played as a knockout competition, with the semi-finals being played in August and the final and third-place playoff being played the following February. However, the competition was eventually structured as a round-robin, with each team playing each of the others once, resulting in a total of six games in each season of the competition. Three of the teams involved (Wales, Scotland and Northern Ireland) had formerly competed in the now defunct British Home Championship, along with England. The matches in the 2011 tournament were played in February and May, with the location due to rotate on a tournament-by-tournament basis. Brittany also expressed an interest in taking part.

=== Venue ===
The newly rebuilt Aviva Stadium was chosen to host all six games of the 2011 tournament.

Dublin
Aviva Stadium
Capacity: 51,700
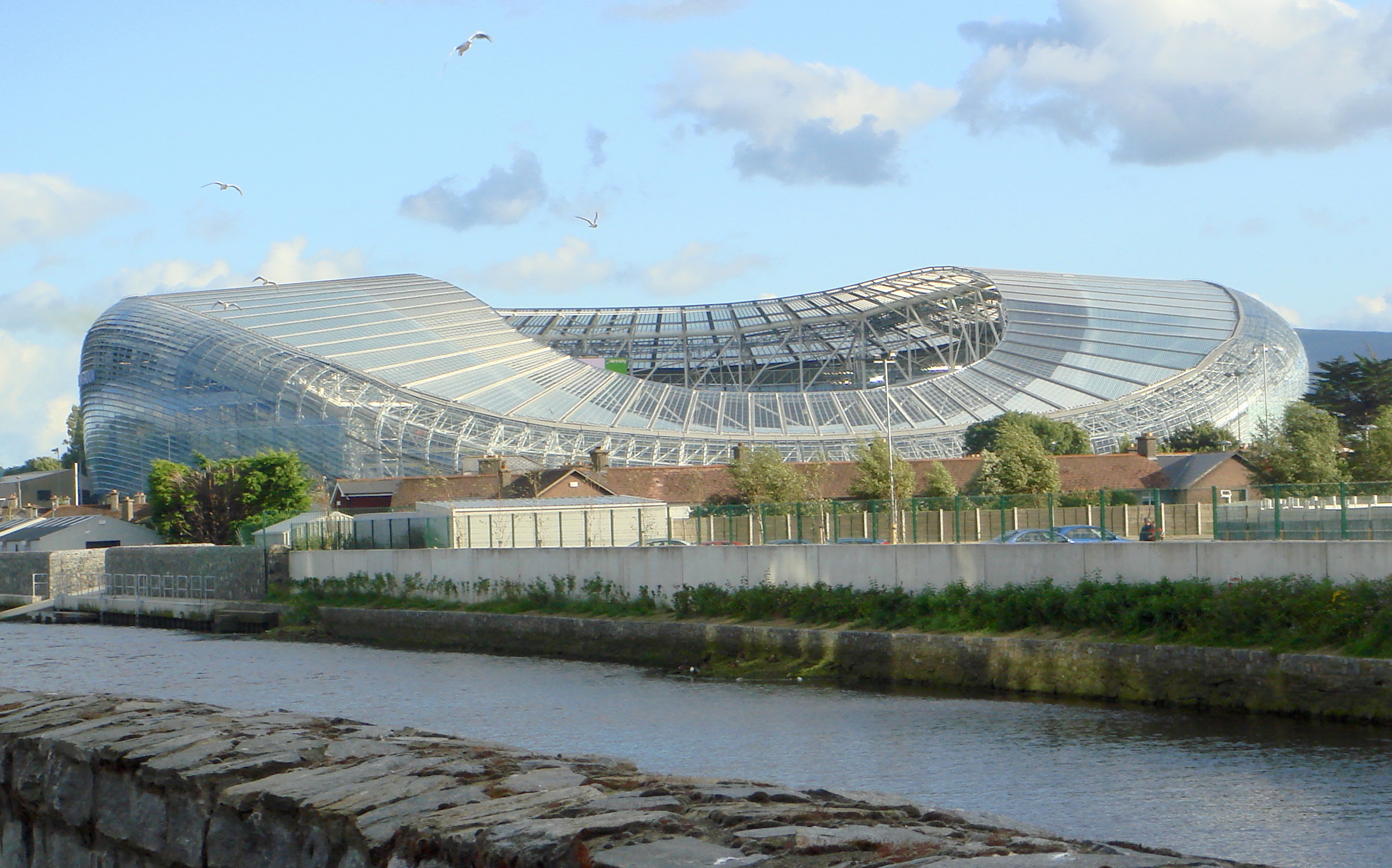

=== Referees ===
- (Republic of Ireland) Tomás Connolly
- (Northern Ireland) Mark Courtney
- (Northern Ireland) Raymond Crangle
- (Republic of Ireland) Alan Kelly
- (Scotland) Craig Thomson
- (Wales) Mark Whitby

== Summary ==
=== Matchday one ===
==== Republic of Ireland v Wales ====
The opening match of the competition was played on 8 February 2011 in front of more than 19,000 spectators and featured tournament hosts the Republic of Ireland and Wales. The match was Gary Speed's first fixture in charge of Wales since his appointment as manager in December 2010. Ireland nearly took an early lead when Damien Duff struck the post within the opening five minutes of the game. Wales were denied a penalty by referee Mark Courtney when Hal Robson-Kanu went down in the Ireland penalty box under pressure from Séamus Coleman in a first half that was described by The Guardian as "tame and error-strewn". Ireland registered a number of chances early in the second half before Darron Gibson scored the tournament's opening goal when he played a one-two with Glenn Whelan before scoring from 25 yards. Duff added a second seven minutes later with his first international goal for five years before Keith Fahey scored his side's third goal in the final ten minutes with a 20-yard free-kick.

8 February 2011
19:45

Republic of Ireland	3–0	Wales
Gibson 60'; Duff 67'; Fahey 83'	Report

Aviva Stadium, Dublin
Attendance: 19,783
Referee: Mark Courtney (Northern Ireland)

GK	1	Shay Given (c)
CB	2	Sean St Ledger
LB	3	Ciaran Clark
RB	4	John O'Shea	(substituted off) 85'
CB	5	Richard Dunne
CM	6	Glenn Whelan	(substituted off) 76'
RM	7	Séamus Coleman	(substituted off) 59'
CM	8	Darron Gibson	(substituted off) 81'
CF	9	Kevin Doyle	(substituted off) 46'
CF	10	Jonathan Walters
LM	11	Damien Duff	(substituted off) 71'
Substitutions:
FW	17	Shane Long	(substituted on) 46'
MF	18	Keith Fahey	(substituted on) 59'
MF	13	Andy Keogh	(substituted on) 71'
MF	12	Paul Green	(substituted on) 76'
MF	14	Marc Wilson	(substituted on) 81'
DF	19	Darren O'Dea	(substituted on) 85'
Manager:
(Italy) Giovanni Trapattoni

GK	1	Wayne Hennessey
RB	2	Neal Eardley	(substituted off) 46'
LB	3	Sam Ricketts	(substituted off) 83'
CB	4	Danny Collins
CB	5	James Collins (c)
CM	6	Andrew Crofts
CM	7	David Vaughan	(substituted off) 61'
CM	8	Andy King
RF	9	Simon Church
CF	10	Robert Earnshaw	(substituted off) 80'
LF	11	Hal Robson-Kanu	(substituted off) 68'
Substitutions:
DF	13	Chris Gunter	(substituted on) 46'
MF	16	Joe Ledley	(substituted on) 61'
MF	15	Freddy Eastwood	(substituted on) 68'
FW	14	Jermaine Easter	(substituted on) 80'
DF	21	Lewin Nyatanga	(substituted on) 83'
Manager:
(Wales) Gary Speed

==== Northern Ireland v Scotland ====
Northern Ireland and Scotland met a day after the opening match, attracting a crowd of more than 18,000. Scotland midfielder Scott Brown suffered an injury in the warm-up leading to his withdrawal from the starting line-up. When the match began, Northern Ireland enjoyed the brighter start as Niall McGinn saw a shot saved by opposition goalkeeper Allan McGregor However, Scotland soon took control of the match and Kenny Miller, captaining Scotland for the first time in his career, gave his side the lead after 19 minutes after a corner fell to him a yard from the goalline. The goal was the first Scotland had scored in an away fixture since December 2009. Scotland applied further pressure; Steven Caldwell hit the crossbar with a header and Kris Commons' shot was cleared off the goalline before James McArthur, Brown's late replacement in the side, added a second goal after 31 minutes. In the opening minutes of the second half, Scotland scored a third goal via Commons. The match ended in a 3–0 victory for Scotland, matching Ireland's opening result and recording the biggest away victory for the Scots in more than five years.

9 February 2011
19:45

Northern Ireland	0–3	Scotland
	Report	Miller 19'; McArthur 31'; Commons 51'

Aviva Stadium, Dublin
Attendance: 18,742
Referee: Tomás Connolly (Republic of Ireland)

GK	1	Jonathan Tuffey (c)
RB	2	Rory McArdle	(substituted off) 46'
LB	3	Chris Baird
CM	4	Gareth McAuley
CB	5	Stephen Craigan	(substituted off) 66'
CB	6	Corry Evans
RM	7	Paddy McCourt
CM	8	Steven Davis	(substituted off) 58'
CF	9	Rory Patterson
CF	10	Grant McCann	(substituted off) 46'
LM	11	Niall McGinn	(substituted off) 72'
Substitutions:
DF	13	Lee Hodson	(substituted on) 46'
FW	15	David Healy	(substituted on) 46'
MF	17	Oliver Norwood	(substituted on) 58'
MF	14	Adam Thompson	(substituted on) 66'
FW	16	Liam Boyce	(substituted on) 72'
Manager:
(Northern Ireland) Nigel Worthington

GK	1	Allan McGregor
RB	2	Alan Hutton
LB	3	Phil Bardsley	(substituted off) 58'
CB	4	Christophe Berra
CB	5	Steven Caldwell
CM	6	Charlie Adam	(substituted off) 58'
AM	7	James Morrison	(substituted off) 79'
RM	8	Steven Naismith	(substituted off) 58'
CF	9	Kenny Miller (c)	(substituted off) 87'
LM	11	Kris Commons	(substituted off) 72'
CM	13	James McArthur
Substitutions:
MF	15	Barry Bannan	(substituted on) 58'
DF	16	Mark Wilson	(substituted on) 58'
MF	20	Robert Snodgrass	(substituted on) 58'
MF	17	Craig Conway	(substituted on) 72'
FW	19	Chris Maguire	(substituted on) 79'
DF	14	Danny Wilson	(substituted on) 87'
Manager:
(Scotland) Craig Levein

=== Matchday two ===
==== Republic of Ireland v Northern Ireland ====
The second round of fixtures began with a fixture between the Republic of Ireland and neighbouring Northern Ireland on 24 May. A row between the two nations over player eligibility, brought on by two Northern Irish youth internationals changing allegiances in the lead up to the fixture, lead to a boycott of the match by fans of the side with only around 200 travelling to the game. Although Northern Ireland started well, the Republic took the lead shortly before half-time through debutant Stephen Ward after an error by opposition goalkeeper Alan Blayney. Republic striker Robbie Keane capitalised on another defensive error shortly afterwards, intercepting a pass by Lee Hodson before converting. The Republic added a third before half time when Northern Ireland defender Craig Cathcart turned a cross into his own net.

Early in the second half, a poor clearance by Blayney led to Adam Thompson conceding a penalty following a foul on Keane. Thompson received the only red card of the Nations Cup for his foul, despite Keane calling for leniency from referee Craig Thomson. Keane converted the resulting penalty for his second goal of the game. Another debutant, Simon Cox, scored a fifth for the Republic with ten minutes remaining. The five goal deficit was the largest margin of victory ever recorded by the Republic over Northern Ireland and was the Republic's largest victory since a win over San Marino by the same scoreline in 2006.

24 May 2011
19:45

Republic of Ireland	5–0	Northern Ireland
Ward 24'; Keane 37', 54' (pen.); Cathcart 45' (o.g.); Cox 80'	Report

Aviva Stadium, Dublin
Attendance: 15,083
Referee: Craig Thomson (Scotland)

GK	1	Shay Given	(substituted off) 72'
RB	2	Paul McShane
CB	4	Stephen Kelly
CB	5	Damien Delaney
LB	3	Stephen Ward
CM	6	Kevin Foley	(substituted off) 70'
RM	7	Séamus Coleman	(substituted off) 55'
CM	8	Keith Andrews
CF	9	Simon Cox
CF	10	Robbie Keane (c)	(substituted off) 62'
LM	11	Keith Treacy
Substitutions:
MF	13	Liam Lawrence	(substituted on) 55'
MF	12	Andy Keogh	(substituted on) 62'
MF	17	Stephen Hunt	(substituted on) 70'
GK	16	David Forde	(substituted on) 72'
Manager:
(Italy) Giovanni Trapattoni

GK	1	Alan Blayney
RB	2	Adam Thompson	(red card) 54'
LB	3	Lee Hodson
CB	4	Craig Cathcart
CB	5	Gareth McAuley (c)
RM	6	Sammy Clingan
CM	7	Josh Carson		(substituted off) 72'
CM	8	Steven Davis		(substituted off) 76'
CF	9	Josh McQuoid		(substituted off) 46'
CF	10	Warren Feeney		(substituted off) 72'
LM	11	Johnny Gorman		(substituted off) 56'
Substitutions:
MF	14	Oliver Norwood		(substituted on) 46'
DF	13	Colin Coates		(substituted on) 56'
MF	15	Niall McGinn		(substituted on) 72'
FW	16	Liam Boyce		(substituted on) 72'
MF	17	Robert Garrett		(substituted on) 76'
Manager:
(Northern Ireland) Nigel Worthington

==== Wales v Scotland ====
25 May 2011
19:45

Wales	1–3	Scotland
Earnshaw 36'	Report	Morrison 55'; Miller 63'; Berra 70'

Aviva Stadium, Dublin
Attendance: 6,036
Referee: Raymond Crangle (Northern Ireland)

GK	1	Boaz Myhill
RB	2	Neal Eardley	(substituted off) 61'
LB	3	Neil Taylor	(substituted off) 46'
CM	4	Owain Tudur Jones	(substituted off) 72'
CB	5	Craig Morgan
CB	6	Darcy Blake
CM	7	Andy Dorman	(substituted off) 61'
CM	8	Andy King	(substituted off) 61'
CF	9	Sam Vokes	(substituted off) 72'
CF	10	Robert Earnshaw (c)
CF	11	Jermaine Easter
Substitutions:
DF	13	Chris Gunter	(substituted on) 46'
MF	17	Aaron Ramsey	(substituted on) 61'
DF	18	Adam Matthews	(substituted on) 61'
MF	19	David Cotterill	(substituted on) 61'
MF	16	David Vaughan	(substituted on) 72'
FW	20	Steve Morison	(substituted on) 72'
Manager:
(Wales) Gary Speed

GK	1	Allan McGregor
RB	2	Steven Whittaker	(substituted off) 81'
LB	3	Stephen Crainey	(substituted off) 81'
CB	4	Christophe Berra
CB	5	Gary Caldwell	(substituted off) 84'
LM	6	James Morrison	(substituted off) 74'
CF	7	Ross McCormack	(substituted off) 74'
CM	8	Scott Brown
CF	9	Kenny Miller (c)
CM	10	Charlie Adam	(substituted off) 88'
RM	11	Steven Naismith
Substitutions:
MF	16	Barry Robson	(substituted on) 74'
MF	18	Barry Bannan	(substituted on) 74'
DF	14	Phil Bardsley	(substituted on) 81'
DF	20	Russell Martin	(substituted on) 81'
DF	22	Grant Hanley	(substituted on) 84'
MF	13	James McArthur	(substituted on) 88'
Manager:
(Scotland) Craig Levein

=== Matchday three ===
==== Wales v Northern Ireland ====
27 May 2011
19:45

Wales	2–0	Northern Ireland
Ramsey 36'; Earnshaw 69'	Report

Aviva Stadium, Dublin
Attendance: 529
Referee: Alan Kelly (Republic of Ireland)

GK	1	Wayne Hennessey	(substituted off) 74'
DF	2	Chris Gunter	(substituted off) 72'
DF	3	Neil Taylor
MF	4	Jack Collison	(substituted off) 61'
DF	5	Danny Collins
DF	6	Danny Gabbidon
AM	7	David Cotterill
CF	8	Craig Bellamy	(substituted off) 61'
CF	9	Steve Morison	(substituted off) 80'
MF	10	Aaron Ramsey (c)	(substituted off) 89'
MF	11	David Vaughan
Substitutions:
CF	17	Robert Earnshaw	(substituted on) 61'
MF	16	Owain Tudur Jones	(substituted on) 61'
DF	13	Adam Matthews	(substituted on) 72'
GK	12	Lewis Price	(substituted on) 74'
CF	18	Sam Vokes	(substituted on) 80'
MF	19	Andy Dorman	(substituted on) 89'
Manager:
(Wales) Gary Speed

GK	1	Jonathan Tuffey
DF	2	Lee Hodson
DF	3	Colin Coates
DF	4	Craig Cathcart	(substituted off) 61'
DF	5	Gareth McAuley (c)
MF	6	Oliver Norwood
MF	7	Josh Carson
MF	8	Robert Garrett	(substituted off) 75'
MF	9	Niall McGinn	(substituted off) 80'
FW	10	Warren Feeney	(substituted off) 72'
FW	11	Johnny Gorman
Substitutions:
MF	15	Stuart Dallas	(substituted on) 61'
FW	14	Liam Boyce	(substituted on) 72'
DF	13	Carl Winchester	(substituted on) 75'
FW	16	Jordan Owens	(substituted on) 80'
Manager:
(Northern Ireland) Nigel Worthington

==== Republic of Ireland v Scotland ====
29 May 2011
18:30

Republic of Ireland	1–0	Scotland
Keane 23'	Report

Aviva Stadium, Dublin
Attendance: 17,694
Referee: Mark Whitby (Wales)

GK	1	Shay Given
CB	2	Paul McShane	(yellow card) 42'
LB	3	Stephen Ward
RB	4	Stephen Kelly
CB	5	Darren O'Dea		(substituted off) 66'
CM	6	Keith Fahey	(yellow card) 48'
RM	7	Liam Lawrence		(substituted off) 62'
CM	8	Keith Andrews	(yellow card) 90'
CF	9	Simon Cox
CF	10	Robbie Keane (c)		(substituted off) 83'
LM	11	Stephen Hunt
Substitutions:
MF	13	Séamus Coleman		(substituted on) 62'
DF	12	Kevin Foley	(yellow card) 73'	(substituted on) 66'
MF	15	Keith Treacy		(substituted on) 83'
Manager:
(Italy) Giovanni Trapattoni

GK	1	Allan McGregor
RB	2	Steven Whittaker
LB	3	Phil Bardsley
CB	4	Christophe Berra
CB	5	Grant Hanley
RM	6	Barry Robson		(substituted off) 75'
LM	7	James Forrest		(substituted off) 85'
CM	8	Scott Brown
CF	9	Kenny Miller (c)	(yellow card) 76'
CM	10	Charlie Adam	(yellow card) 62'	(substituted off) 63'
CF	11	Steven Naismith
Substitutions:
MF	16	Barry Bannan		(substituted on) 63'
MF	19	Chris Maguire		(substituted on) 75'
FW	17	Ross McCormack		(substituted on) 85'
Manager:
(Scotland) Craig Levein

=== Standings ===
Pos	Team	Pld	W	D	L	GF	GA	GD	Pts
1	Republic of Ireland	3	3	0	0	9	0	+9	9
2	Scotland	3	2	0	1	6	2	+4	6
3	Wales	3	1	0	2	3	6	−3	3
4	Northern Ireland	3	0	0	3	0	10	−10	0

Source: rssssf.com
Rules for classification: 1) Points; 2) Goal difference; 3) Number of goals scored;

=== Goalscorers ===
3 goals

- (Republic of Ireland) Robbie Keane

2 goals

- (Scotland) Kenny Miller
- (Wales) Robert Earnshaw

1 goal

- (Scotland) Christophe Berra
- (Scotland) Kris Commons
- (Republic of Ireland) Simon Cox
- (Republic of Ireland) Damien Duff
- (Republic of Ireland) Keith Fahey
- (Republic of Ireland) Darron Gibson
- (Scotland) James McArthur
- (Scotland) James Morrison
- (Wales) Aaron Ramsey
- (Republic of Ireland) Stephen Ward

1 goal (own goal)

- (Northern Ireland) Craig Cathcart (for Republic of Ireland)

== Media coverage ==
Every match of the tournament was shown live on Sky Sports (also on Sky 3D), with the Wales matches simulcasted live with Welsh language commentary on S4C.

- United Kingdom and Ireland: Sky Sports
  - Ireland: RTÉ (Highlights of all matches)
  - Northern Ireland: BBC Northern Ireland (Highlights of Northern Irish matches only)
  - Wales: S4C (Welsh matches only)

== Aftermath ==
=== Criticism ===
The Football Association of Ireland was criticised by the media, supporters and other football associations for setting high ticket prices. The 51,700-capacity Aviva Stadium was less than half-full for all of the games. The game between Wales and Northern Ireland was attended by only 529 fans, many of whom were Scots who happened to be in Dublin for their country's game two days later.

During the game between the Republic of Ireland and Northern Ireland, Republic fans booed "God Save the Queen", and Northern Ireland fans booed the President of Ireland, Mary McAleese, as she greeted players before the game. Northern Ireland fans were criticised for singing sectarian chants at games. Scotland fans also booed "God Save the Queen", when playing Northern Ireland.

Wales manager Gary Speed criticised the tournament organisers for scheduling Wales' games to be within three days of each other, the only team to suffer such timing. He also criticised the officiating in the game against Scotland, in which in his opinion several fouls on Welsh players went unpunished.

=== Future tournaments ===
After the first tournament, which attracted some small attendances, there was a dispute about the division of revenues between the four associations. In early 2011, it was reported by BBC Sport that there was a possibility of the British Home Championship being revived in 2013, but no tournament was held. Jim Shaw, the president of the Irish Football Association, said in January 2012 that he did not envisage a second tournament being staged.
