= Stephen McBride (footballer, born 1983) =

Footballer from Northern Ireland

Personal information
- Full name: Stephen McBride
- Date of birth: 6 April 1983 (age 43)
- Place of birth: Belfast, Northern Ireland
- Position: Left back

Youth career
- 2001–2002: Civil Service

Senior career*
| Years | Team | Apps | (Gls) |
| 2002–2013 | Crusaders | 278 | (5) |
| 2013–2017 | Ballymena United | 68 | (1) |
| Total | | 346 | (6) |
- * Club domestic league appearances and goals as of 6 May 2017

Stephen McBride (born 6 April 1983) is a retired footballer from Northern Ireland. McBride was named in the 2008 Irish League Select XI.

'Steeky', as he is known by the fans, began his career as an amateur at Civil Service, before being snapped up by then manager Alan Dornan in the summer of 2002. Since then, was the first choice left-back for many years at Crusaders, making his 300th appearance in a 2–1 victory over Glentoran.

McBride has won many honours with the Crues, and was part of the side that became All-Ireland champions by winning the 2012 Setanta Sports Cup, although he was sent off at the end of normal time.

McBride signed for Ballymena United in the summer of 2013.

== Honours ==
Crusaders

- Irish Cup (1): 2008–09
- Setanta Sports Cup (1): 2012
- Irish League Cup (1): 2011–12
- County Antrim Shield (1): 2009–10
- Irish First Division (1): 2005–06
- IFA Intermediate League Cup (1): 2005–06
- Steel & Sons Cup (1): 2005–06
