= 2011–12 County Antrim Shield =

Tournament details
- Country: Northern Ireland
- Teams: 8

Final positions
- Champions: Cliftonville (9th win)
- Runners-up: Glentoran

Tournament statistics
- Matches played: 7
- Goals scored: 36 (5.14 per match)

The 2011–12 County Antrim Shield was the 123rd edition of the County Antrim Shield, a cup competition in Northern Irish football.

Cliftonville won the tournament for the 9th time, defeating Glentoran 2–1 in the final.

== Results ==
=== Quarter-finals ===
| Team 1 | Score | Team 2 |
|---|---|---|
| Ballymena United | 0–1 | Linfield |
| Carrick Rangers | 2–5 | Glentoran |
| Crusaders | 3–3 (a.e.t.) (4–5 p) | Lisburn Distillery |
| Donegal Celtic | 2–3 | Cliftonville |

=== Semi-finals ===
| Team 1 | Score | Team 2 |
|---|---|---|
| Cliftonville | 6–2 | Linfield |
| Lisburn Distillery | 1–5 | Glentoran |

=== Final ===
29 November 2011

| Glentoran | 1–2 | Cliftonville |
|---|---|---|
| Taylor 90' | Report | Donnelly 43' (pen.); Gormley 87' |

The Oval, Belfast
Referee: Colin Burns
