= David Magowan =

Northern Irish footballer

Personal information
- Date of birth: 4 October 1983 (age 43)
- Place of birth: Belfast, Northern Ireland
- Position: Defender

Senior career*
Years	Team	Apps	(Gls)
1999–2002	Glentoran	0	(0)
2002–2003	Bangor	28	(1)
2003–2016	Crusaders	347	(2)
2006	→ Comber Rec. (loan)	4	(0)
Total		379	(3)
- * Club domestic league appearances and goals as of 18:00, 21 February 2015

David Magowan (born 4 October 1983) is a former footballer from Northern Ireland who played as a defender.

== Career ==
After being released after three years at Glentoran, 'Mags' joined Bangor, spending a successful season there, before signing for Crusaders in the summer of 2003. He initially established himself as first choice centre-back, but was loaned out to Comber Recreation in 2006, and it looked like his Crusaders days may have been at an end, yet managed to re-establish himself in the side.

He scored his first Crusaders goal on 20 December 2008 against Dungannon Swifts. and his second against Coleraine F.C. on 23 November 2013. He missed the 2009 Irish Cup final due to suspension. Despite this, he was still named in the 2008–09 Irish League Team of the Year, along with teammates Colin Coates, Gareth McKeown, and Martin Donnelly.
