= Chris Morrow =

Northern Irish footballer (born 1985)

Personal information
- Full name: Christopher Morrow
- Date of birth: 20 September 1985 (age 41)
- Place of birth: Belfast, Northern Ireland
- Position: Midfielder

Youth career
- 2002–2003: Crusaders

Senior career*
Years	Team	Apps	(Gls)
2002–2016	Crusaders	396	(64)
2016	→ Glentoran (loan)	12	(0)
2016–2018	Carrick Rangers	46	(0)
2018–2019	Harland and Wolff Welders		
2019–2022	Brantwood	0	(0)
- * Club domestic league appearances and goals as of 01:24, 28 December 2016

Chris Morrow (born 20 September 1985) is a former Northern Irish footballer

== Playing career ==
Morrow has played for Crusaders as a midfielder since making his debut in 2003, and was voted Ulster Young Footballer of the Year in 2003–04. He was a fan favourite for Crusaders for several years, and was instrumental in their promotion back to the Irish Premier Division, and was part of both the Irish Cup and County Antrim Shield winning sides. He was also named in the Irish League Select XI in 2008.

On 30 October 2010 in a league victory against Coleraine, he pulled on the goalkeeping jersey for the final 10 minutes, after Niall Murphy had been sent off. He kept a clean sheet for the remainder of the match despite intense pressure., and repeated the feat later that season against Newry City, this time playing as goalkeeper for a full hour after goalkeeper Chris Keenan was stretchered off. That season he also scored the winning goal against Linfield at Seaview, the first time the Crues had beaten the Blues since 1999.

On 28 January 2012, Morrow scored the only goal of the Irish League Cup final victory over Coleraine.

He was named Northern Ireland Football Writers' Association Player of the Year for 2011–12.

In October 2014, he suffered a broken ankle against Linfield. It was another in a succession of injuries, having broken his leg several years previously. In January 2016, having not appeared for the Crusaders first team since then and to aid his recovery, he joined Glentoran on loan.

Following his release from Crusaders, Morrow signed for NIFL Premiership side Carrick Rangers.

In June 2018, he signed for NIFL Championship side Harland & Wolff Welders.

In August 2019, he signed for Ballymena & Provincial League side Brantwood, leaving in May 2022 and announcing his retirement from the game.

== Honours ==
Crusaders

- NIFL Premiership (1): 2014–15
- Irish Cup (1): 2008–09
- Setanta Cup (1): 2012
- Irish League Cup (1): 2011–12
- County Antrim Shield (1): 2009–10
- Irish First Division (1): 2005–06
- IFA Intermediate League Cup (1): 2005–06
- Steel & Sons Cup (1): 2005–06
