= Martin Donnelly (footballer, born 1988) =

Northern Irish footballer

Personal information
- Date of birth: 28 August 1988 (age 38)
- Place of birth: Belfast, Northern Ireland
- Position: Winger

Youth career
- Sheffield United

Senior career*
Years	Team	Apps	(Gls)
2005–2008	Sheffield United	0	(0)
2008	→ Rochdale (loan)	0	(0)
2008–2011	Crusaders	98	(14)
2011–2017	Cliftonville	219	(23)
2017–2021	Larne	60	(16)
2021–2022	Linfield	18	(1)
Total		395	(54)

International career
2004–2005	Northern Ireland U17	5	(1)
2005–2007	Northern Ireland U19	6	(2)
2007–2008	Northern Ireland U20	3	(0)
2007–2009	Northern Ireland U21	5	(0)
2009	Northern Ireland U23	3	(1)
2009	Northern Ireland	1	(0)
- * Club domestic league appearances and goals

Martin Donnelly (born 28 August 1988) is a Northern Irish retired footballer born in Belfast who played as a winger.

After previously playing for Sheffield United and Rochdale, without appearing in the Football League, Donnelly signed for Crusaders in the summer of 2008, and won the Irish Cup in 2009. Along with team-mate Colin Coates, he was called up to the Northern Ireland squad for the match against Italy on 6 June 2009. Donnelly entered the game as an 82nd-minute substitute to win his first full cap, to add to the three under-21 caps he had won previously.

During his time with the Crues, he made a total of 126 appearances, scoring 22 goals. After turning down the club's offer of a new contract midway through the 2010–11 season, Donnelly joined North Belfast rivals Cliftonville on a two-year contract, of whom he is a lifelong fan.

Donnelly joined Larne in the 2018 transfer window and quickly established himself as a firm fans favourite. He scored 24 goals as the club romped to the 2018/19 Championship title. On 16 August 2021 it was announced that Donnelly had signed for Linfield, as part of a player exchange deal which saw Navid Nasseri move to Larne.

== Honours ==
Crusaders

- Irish Cup: 2008–09
- County Antrim Shield: 2009–10

Cliftonville

- County Antrim Shield: 2011–12
- NIFL Premiership: 2012–13, 2013–14
- Irish League Cup: 2012–13, 2013–14, 2014–15, 2015–16

Larne

- County Antrim Shield: 2020–21
- NIFL Championship: 2018–19

Individual

- Ulster Young Player of the Year: 2008–09
- NIFL Championship Player of the Year 2018–19
- NIFL Championship Team of the Year 2018–19
- NIFL Premiership Team of the Year 2020–21
