= Northern Ireland national under-23 football team =

National U-23 association football team

Northern Ireland Under-23
- Nickname(s): Green & White Army, Norn Iron
- Association: Irish Football Association
- Head coach: Ronnie McFall
- Home stadium: Various
| First colours | Second colours |

The Northern Ireland national under-23 football team is an association football team representing Northern Ireland featuring footballers playing in the Irish League. The team first played at this level in 2007 when entering the International Challenge Trophy for national semi-professional Under-23 sides, though previously the Northern Ireland Under-23 team offered a recognised stepping stone for all young players hoping to progress to the full Northern Ireland side.

== The Original Under-23s ==
The original Northern Ireland Under-23 side played a total of ten matches, all but three in the 1960s. Players to have stepped up from the Under-23 side to full international level include Pat Jennings, Bryan Hamilton, Neil Lennon and Sammy Clingan.

=== Results ===
| Date | Opponent | Venue | Result | Scorers |
|---|---|---|---|---|
| 07-02-1962 | Wales | Windsor Park, Belfast | Drew 0–0 | |
| 27-02-1963 | Wales | Vetch Field, Swansea | Lost 1–5 | Jimmy McLaughlin |
| 05-02-1964 | Wales | Windsor Park, Belfast | Drew 3–3 | Willie Irvine (2), Jimmy McLaughlin |
| 10-02-1965 | Wales | Ninian Park, Cardiff | Drew 2–2 | Willie Irvine, Dave Clements |
| 22-02-1967 | Wales | Windsor Park, Belfast | Won 2–1 | Vic McKinney (2) |
| 20-03-1968 | Wales | Vetch Field, Swansea | Won 1–0 | Shaun Dunlop |
| 26-03-1969 | Italy | Communale Stadium, Brescia | Lost 1–2 | Brendan Mullan |
| 11-04-1989 | Republic of Ireland | Dalymount Park, Dublin | Lost 0–3 | |
| 15-05-1990 | Republic of Ireland | Shamrock Park, Portadown | Lost 2–3 | Stephen McBride, John Devine |
| 27-04-2004 | Serbia & Montenegro | Mourneview Park, Lurgan | Drew 0–0 | (billed an Under 21–23 team) |

== The New Under-23s ==
The Irish FA announced on 2 October 2007 that they would be entering a side in the International Challenge Trophy. The team was selected only from players playing in the IFA Premiership and as such it is also a successor to the Irish League representative team. For the 2007–09 International Challenge Trophy the team was managed by Linfield's David Jeffrey and for the 2009-11 International Challenge Trophy by Portadown's Ronnie McFall. On both occasions Northern Ireland failed to make it beyond the group stage, and have not entered a team since.

=== 2007–09 International Challenge Trophy ===
11 December 2007

| Belgium U-23 | 2–1 | Northern Ireland U-23 |
|---|---|---|
| 58 Hubert; 85 Lutun | (Report) | 46 Peter Thompson |

Stade Luc Varenne, Tournai, Belgium

13 May 2008

| Northern Ireland U-23 | 0–1 | Republic of Ireland U-23 |
|---|---|---|
| | (Report) | 88 Stephen Rice |

Mourneview Park, Lurgan, Northern Ireland
Referee: Adrian McCourt (Northern Ireland)

18 November 2008

| Slovakia U-23 | 1–0 | Northern Ireland U-23 |
|---|---|---|
| 10 Skutka | (Report) |

Senec, Slovakia

=== 2009–11 International Challenge Trophy ===
24 November 2009

| Northern Ireland U-23 | 2–2 | Wales Semi Pro |
|---|---|---|
| Jay Magee; Daryl Fordyce | (Report) |

Shamrock Park, Portadown, Northern Ireland

11 August 2010

| Northern Ireland U-23 | 2–0 | Poland U-23 |
|---|---|---|
| Jordan Owens; Martin Donnelly | (Report) |

The Showgrounds, Coleraine, Northern Ireland

12 October 2010

| Portugal U-23 | 2–0 | Northern Ireland U-23 |
|---|---|---|
| | (Report) |

Municipal Stadium, Cartaxo, Portugal

== Squad ==
Squad for the match against Portugal, 12 October 2010. Clubs correct at time of call-up.

| No. | Pos. | Player | Date of birth (age) | Caps | Goals | Club |
|---|---|---|---|---|---|---|
| | GK | Chris Keenan | 27 January 1987 (age 39) | | | (Irish Football Association) Crusaders |
| | GK | Sean O'Neill | 11 April 1988 (age 38) | | | (Irish Football Association) Dungannon Swifts |
| | DF | Chris Ramsey | 24 May 1990 (age 36) | | | (Irish Football Association) Portadown |
| | MF | Billy Joe Burns | 24 August 1989 (age 37) | | | (Irish Football Association) Linfield |
| | DF | Johnny Taylor | 30 June 1988 (age 38) | | | (Irish Football Association) Glentoran |
| | DF | Jay Magee | 4 May 1988 (age 38) | | 1 | (Irish Football Association) Glenavon |
| | DF | Ross Redman | 23 November 1989 (age 36) | | | (Irish Football Association) Portadown |
| | DF | Archie Stewart | 3 December 1989 (age 36) | | | (Irish Football Association) Ballymena United |
| | MF | Philip Lowry | 15 July 1989 (age 37) | | | (Irish Football Association) Linfield |
| | MF | Robert Garrett | 5 May 1988 (age 38) | | | (Irish Football Association) Linfield |
| | MF | Jamie Mulgrew | 6 May 1986 (age 40) | | | (Irish Football Association) Linfield |
| | MF | Stuart Dallas | 19 April 1991 (age 35) | | | (Irish Football Association) Crusaders |
| | MF | Martin Donnelly | 28 August 1988 (age 38) | | 1 | (Irish Football Association) Crusaders |
| | MF | Michael Carvill | 3 April 1988 (age 38) | | | (Irish Football Association) Linfield |
| | FW | Daryl Fordyce | 2 January 1987 (age 39) | | 1 | (Irish Football Association) Glentoran |
| | FW | Curtis Allen | 22 February 1988 (age 38) | | | (Irish Football Association) Linfield |
| | FW | Jordan Owens | 9 July 1989 (age 37) | | 1 | (Irish Football Association) Crusaders |
| | FW | Darren Boyce | 25 January 1986 (age 40) | | | (Irish Football Association) Coleraine |

== Competitive record ==
=== International Challenge Trophy ===
- 2009 - Group Stage
- 2011 - Group Stage
