= Colin Coates (footballer) =

Northern Irish footballer (born 1985)

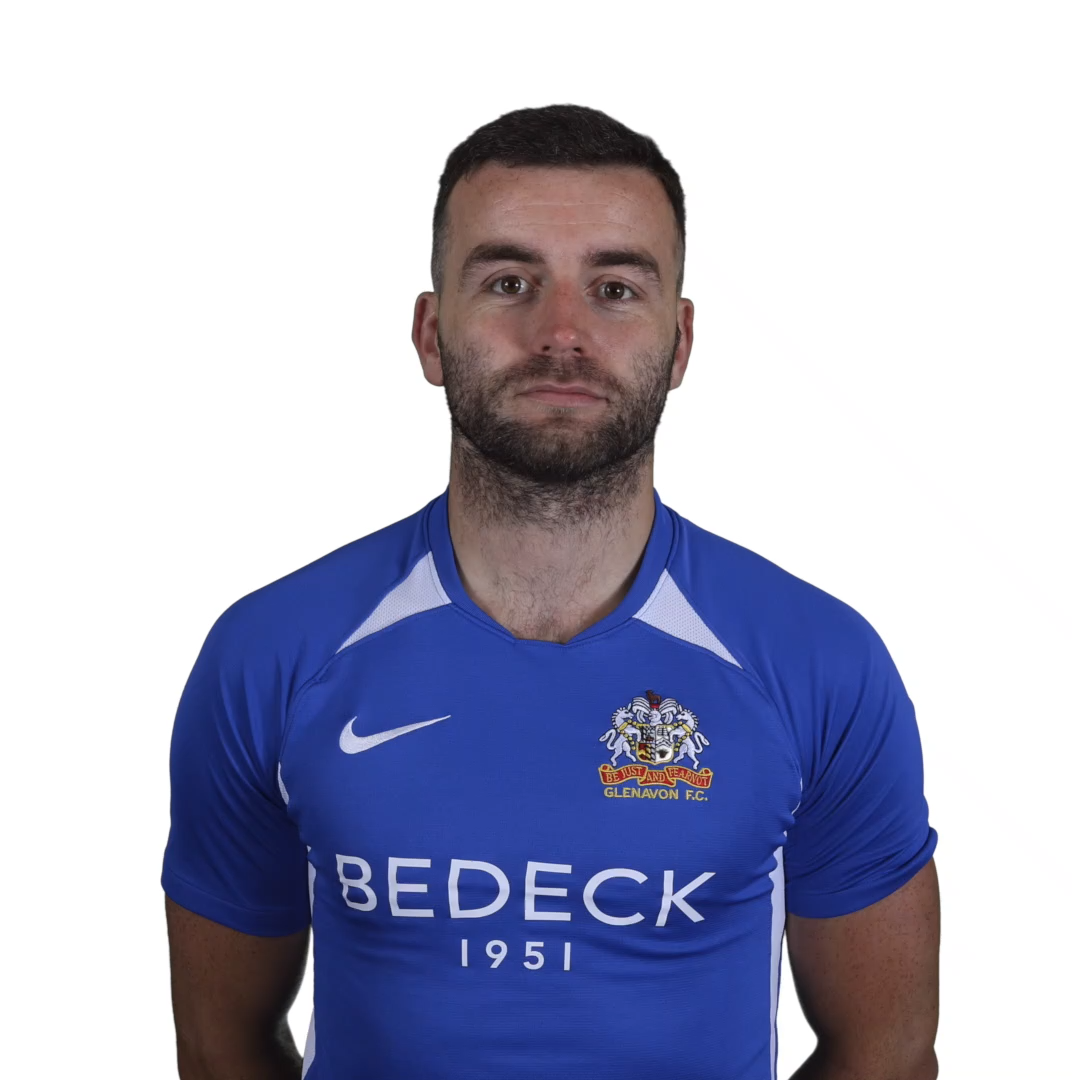
- Coates with Glenavon in 2021.

Personal information
- Date of birth: 26 October 1985 (age 41)
- Place of birth: Belfast, Northern Ireland
- Position: Centre back

Youth career
- 2001–2002: Crusaders

Senior career*
Years	Team	Apps	(Gls)
2002–2020	Crusaders	425	(42)
2020–2021	Glenavon	23	(3)
2021–2023	Cliftonville	39	(2)
2023–2024	Ballymena United	11	(2)

International career^{‡}
2009–2011	Northern Ireland	6	(0)
- * Club domestic league appearances and goals as of 21:16, 19 November 2024 (UTC) ‡ National team caps and goals as of 21:49, 27 May 2011 (UTC)

Colin Coates (born 26 October 1985) is a Northern Irish former semi-professional footballer who was most recently the Assistant Manager of NIFL Premiership side Glenavon.

== Early life ==
Coates was born in Belfast, and attended Grosvenor Grammar School, not traditionally a football-playing school.

== Club career ==
=== Crusaders ===
Coates made a name for himself at Crusaders. He later revealed that at 15, he had the choice of signing for either Crusaders or Glentoran. He made his first-team debut against Chimney Corner in the County Antrim Shield on 29 October 2002, and scored on his league debut, a 2–4 defeat to Glentoran on 9 November.

He has developed a formidable partnership in the centre of defence with David Magowan over the years, and he was part of the team which won the Irish Cup in 2009, He also scored a late equaliser in normal time in the County Antrim Shield final against Linfield. The Crues went on to win the game 3–2.

Coates was instrumental in Crusaders' triumph in the 2012 Setanta Sports Cup. In the semi-final second leg against Sligo Rovers, he scored an extra-time penalty which put Crusaders into the final. In the final itself against Derry City, he scored twice in a 2–2 draw, and scored in the resulting victorious penalty shoot-out in a man of the match performance. He also scored in the 2012 Irish Cup Final in a 1–4 defeat to Linfield. Coates has become the highest scoring central defender in Irish league football with his goal against Glentoran in late 2016. His presence in the box, neat finishing and even freekick taking make him an all round player with a great left foot.

Coates attained three NIFL Premiership titles with Crusaders.

=== Glenavon ===
After playing 577 senior games and scoring 73 goals for Crusaders, spanning 18 years, Coates signed an 18-month contract with Glenavon on 30 January 2020, with the option for a further year. On 21 June 2021 it was announced that Coates had been transfer listed due to restructuring of the playing staff post COVID-19. On 28 August 2021, it was confirmed that Coates had left the club.

=== Cliftonville ===
After his release he signed for Cliftonville. he was part of the side that won the 2021–22 Northern Ireland Football League Cup.

=== Ballymena United ===
On 14 June 2023, Coates signed for Ballymena United, on a two-year contract. On 19 November 2024, it was announced that Coates had left the club to rejoin Glenavon as assistant to incoming manager Paddy McLaughlin.

== International career ==
Coates was called up to the Northern Ireland squad for the match against Italy on 6 June 2009, in which he played the full 90 minutes to receive his first cap.

In May 2010, he was selected for friendly matches against Turkey and Chile (against both of whom he played as a second-half substitute). He also appeared in a friendly against Morocco. As of 11 August 2011, he has received six caps, and is the most capped Crusaders player of all time.

International appearances and goals
Cap	Date	Venue	Opponent	Result	Competition	Goals
1	6 June 2009	Arena Garibaldi, Pisa	Italy	0–3	Friendly	
2	26 May 2010	Veterans Stadium, New Britain	Turkey	0–2	Friendly	
3	30 May 2010	Estadio Municipal, Chillan	Chile	0–1	Friendly	
4	17 November 2010	Windsor Park, Belfast	Morocco	1–1	Friendly	
5	24 May 2011	Aviva Stadium, Dublin	Republic of Ireland	0–5	2011 Nations Cup	
6	27 May 2011	Aviva Stadium, Dublin	Wales	0–2	2011 Nations Cup	

== Honours ==
=== Club ===
Crusaders

- NIFL Premiership (3): 2014–15, 2015–16, 2017–18
- Irish Cup (2): 2008–09, 2018–19
- Setanta Cup (1): 2012
- Irish League Cup (1): 2011–12
- County Antrim Shield (3): 2009–10, 2017–18, 2018–19
- IFA Intermediate League (1): 2005–06
- IFA Intermediate League Cup (1): 2005–06
- Steel & Sons Cup (1): 2005–06

Cliftonville

- Irish League Cup: 2021-22

=== Individual ===
- Irish League Team of the Year (2): 2008–09, 2009–10
