= David McDaid =

Irish footballer (born 1990)

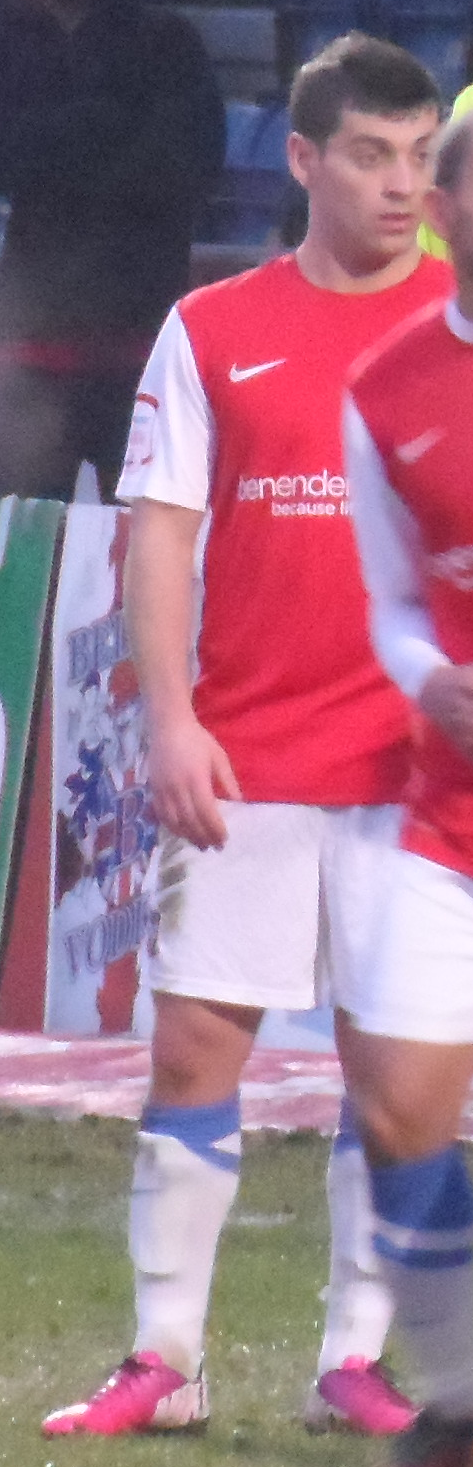
- McDaid playing for York City in 2013

Personal information
- Full name: David Gerard McDaid
- Date of birth: 3 December 1990 (age 35)
- Place of birth: Derry, Northern Ireland
- Height: 5 ft 9 in (1.75 m)
- Position: Striker

Team information
- Current team: Portstewart (player/assistant manager)

Youth career
- Tristar Boys

Senior career*
Years	Team	Apps	(Gls)
2008–2012	Derry City	86	(21)
2008	→ Sligo Rovers (loan)	9	(1)
2009	→ Finn Harps (loan)	12	(2)
2013	York City	4	(0)
2013	Derry City	12	(5)
2014	Coleraine	7	(2)
2014–2017	Cliftonville	113	(51)
2017	Waterford	26	(13)
2017–2022	Larne	127	(57)
2022–2023	Ballymena United	33	(7)
2023–2024	Coleraine	22	(3)
2024–2025	Glenavon	51	(12)
2026–	Portstewart	0	(0)

International career
2008	Republic of Ireland U19	2	(0)
- * Club domestic league appearances and goals as of 30 November 2025

David Gerard McDaid (born 3 December 1990) is an Irish professional footballer who plays as a striker and is currently player/assistant manager of NIFL Premier Intermediate League side Portstewart.

== Club career ==
=== Derry City ===
Born in Derry, McDaid played for Tristar Boys in the Derry and District League Youth Leagues for a number of seasons. He later joined League of Ireland Premier Division side Derry City, who loaned him to divisional rivals Sligo Rovers for the remainder of the 2008 season on 29 July 2008. He made his debut on 2 August 2008 as a 70th minute substitute for Sean Doherty in Sligo's 1–0 home defeat to Cork City. McDaid's first and only for the club goal came with Sligo's third goal in a 4–0 home win over Cobh Ramblers on 27 September 2008 before finishing the loan spell with nine appearances.

He was loaned out to Finn Harps of the League of Ireland First Division at the start of the 2009 season. He scored on his debut for Finn Harps, with an 84th-minute equaliser in a 1–1 draw at Kildare County on the opening day of the season. McDaid scored twice in 12 appearances for the club before returning to Derry in the summer of 2009. He broke into the Derry first team, making his debut as an 84th-minute substitute for Liam Kearney in a 3–1 defeat away at Galway United on 16 October 2009. His first goal for Derry came in his next appearance, a 2–1 home defeat against his former loan side Sligo, and this was followed by goals in successive games against St Patrick's Athletic and Bray Wanderers. He finished the 2009 season with three goals in five appearances for Derry.

Derry were expelled to the League of Ireland First Division for the 2010 season, with McDaid becoming one of the first four players to sign for the club alongside Shane McEleney, Patrick McEleney and James McClean, having committed to a two-year contract. McDaid scored the only goal in the team's first win of the campaign against Limerick on 12 March 2010. His first senior hat-trick came in a 7–0 win away to Salthill Devon on 1 May 2010. McDaid finished the season with 5 goals in 28 appearances, having competed with Mark Farren for the leading striker role in a 4–4–1–1 formation, as Derry won the First Division title. He started for Derry in their 1–0 win over Cork in the 2011 League of Ireland Cup Final, and finished the 2011 season with 3 goals in 28 appearances.

McDaid signed a new contract with Derry in January 2012, contracting him to the club for the 2012 season. He played in the 2012 Setanta Sports Cup Final, which Derry lost 5–4 in a penalty shoot-out following a 2–2 draw after extra time. His final appearance for Derry came in the 3–2 extra time win over St Patrick's Athletic in the 2012 FAI Cup Final at the Aviva Stadium. McDaid finished the season with 17 goals in 44 appearances and was offered a new deal by Derry, but opted instead to go on trial with English League Two side Fleetwood Town.

=== York City ===
McDaid signed for League Two side York City on a one-and-a-half-year contract on 29 January 2013, after the club agreed a small compensation fee with Derry. His debut came as a 67th-minute substitute for Michael Potts in York's 4–1 home defeat to Morecambe on 2 February 2013. He finished the 2012–13 season with four substitute appearances for York before he was released by mutual consent on 25 June 2013.

=== Return to Derry City ===
McDaid re-signed for former club Derry City on 1 July 2013, saying "Other clubs expressed an interest in me but I wouldn't play for any League of Ireland club other than Derry City – I'm happy to be turning out for my hometown club again." He made his return in a 2–1 defeat away at Shamrock Rovers on 12 July 2013, before scoring in the following game, a 4–2 away loss to Turkish Süper Lig team Trabzonspor in the second qualifying round of the UEFA Europa League on 18 July. McDaid made 16 appearances and scored seven goals for Derry during the remainder of the 2013 season.

=== Coleraine ===
He signed for NIFL Premiership club Coleraine on 17 December 2013, although he would not be eligible to play until the following month.

=== Cliftonville ===
McDaid moved to champions Cliftonville on a three-year contract in August 2014 as a replacement for the departed Liam Boyce. He made his debut for the club in a 1–0 win at Portadown on 13 August 2014. McDaid won the player of the month award for August 2014 after an impressive start at Cliftonville.

=== Waterford ===
On 17 February 2017 McDaid signed for League of Ireland club Waterford. He made his debut coming off the bench away to Athlone Town on 24 February where Waterford were defeated 1–0. McDaid scored his first goals for the club the following week on 3 March against Cabinteely scoring his sides first and third goals in a 3–0 victory. McDaid played a key part as Waterford won promotion back to the Premier League as league champions. After Waterford beat Wexford 3-0 and Cobh Ramblers were defeated 3-0 by Cabinteely Waterford were officially crowned league champions and promoted back to the League of Ireland Premier Division. McDaid was named in the PFAI First Division team of the year and was nominated for the PFAI First Division Player of the Year award. McDaid left Waterford due to family reasons after establishing himself as a fan favourite.

=== Larne ===
McDaid signed for Larne after leaving Waterford in November 2017 despite interest from Linfield, Glenavon, Sligo Rovers and Finn Harps.

=== Ballymena United ===
On 14 June 2022, it was announced that McDaid had signed a three-year contract to join Ballymena United.

=== Return to Coleraine ===
On 24 June 2023, it was announced that McDaid had signed a three-year contract with Coleraine.

=== Glenavon ===
On 25 June 2024, Glenavon announced that they had signed McDaid from Coleraine for an undisclosed fee. His first goal for the club came against his former side in a 2-0 win at Coleraine Showgrounds on 25 August 2024.

McDaid scored a penalty in a 3-1 win against Ballymena United on 29 November 2025, in what would turn out to be his last game for the club. Shortly after the conclusion of the match, it was announced that McDaid would be departing Glenavon to take up a role as player/assistant manager of NIFL Premier Intermediate League side Portstewart.

== Coaching career ==
=== Portstewart ===
On 29 November 2025, it was announced that McDaid would join NIFL Premier Intermediate League side Portstewart as assistant to newly-appointed manager, John Gregg. From 1 January 2026, he will also register for the club as a player.

== International career ==
Having played for Northern Ireland at Schools Under-18 level, McDaid was capped twice by the Republic of Ireland national under-19 team in 2008. He made his debut after starting a 1–0 friendly home defeat to the Czech Republic on 5 February 2008, before appearing as an 85th-minute substitute for Paul Cahillane in another home defeat to the Czechs two days later. Despite this, he continued to be called up by the Northern Ireland Schools Under-18 team. He was called up by the Northern Ireland national under-21 team for a game against Hungary in August 2012, for which he was an unused substitute.

== Career statistics ==
As of match played 24 February 2014.

Club statistics
Club	Season	League			National Cup		League Cup		Europe		Other		Total	
Club	Season	Division	Apps	Goals	Apps	Goals	Apps	Goals	Apps	Goals	Apps	Goals	Apps	Goals
Sligo Rovers (loan)	2008	LOI Premier Division	9	1	0	0	0	0	—		0	0	9	1
Finn Harps (loan)	2009	LOI First Division	12	2	0	0	0	0	—		0	0	12	2
Derry City	2009	LOI Premier Division	5	3	0	0	0	0	—		0	0	5	3
Derry City	2010	LOI First Division	28	5	0	0	0	0	—		0	0	28	5
Derry City	2011	LOI Premier Division	24	2	0	0	4	1	—		0	0	28	3
Derry City	2012	LOI Premier Division	29	11	6	5	2	0	—		7 (Note: Appearance(s) in Setanta Sports Cup)	1	44	17
Derry City	Total		86	21	6	5	6	1	—		7	1	105	28
York City	2012–13	League Two	4	0	0	0	0	0	—		0	0	4	0
Derry City	2013	LOI Premier Division	12	5	1	0	1	1	2 (Note: Appearances in UEFA Europa League)	1	0	0	16	7
Coleraine	2013–14	NIFL Premiership	7	2	1	0	0	0	—		1	2	9	4
Career total			130	31	8	5	7	2	2	1	8	3	155	42

== Honours ==
Derry City

- League of Ireland First Division: 2010
- League of Ireland Cup: 2011
- FAI Cup: 2012

Waterford

- League of Ireland First Division: 2017

Larne

- NIFL Championship: 2018–19
- County Antrim Shield: 2020–21, 2021–22

Individual

- PFAI First Division Team of the Year: 2017
- NIFL Championship Team of the Year: 2018–19
