= 2011–12 Irish League Cup =

Irn-Bru League Cup

Tournament details
- Country: Northern Ireland
- Teams: 42

Final positions
- Champions: Crusaders (2nd win)
- Runners-up: Coleraine

Tournament statistics
- Matches played: 41
- Goals scored: 178 (4.34 per match)

The 2011–12 Irish League Cup (known as the Irn-Bru League Cup for sponsorship reasons) was the 26th edition of the Irish League Cup, Northern Ireland's secondary football knock-out cup competition. The competition was contested by the 12 members of the IFA Premiership, as well as the 30 members of the IFA Championship. The competition began on 27 August 2011 and ended with the final on 28 January 2012.

Lisburn Distillery were the defending champions, following a 2–1 victory over Portadown in the previous season's final. However, they were eliminated in the Third Round by Crusaders.

Crusaders went on to win the cup for the second time by defeating Coleraine 1–0 in the final.

== First round ==
The draw for the first round was made on 22 August 2011. The games were played in a one-leg format on 27 August and 30 August 2011.

Ards, Bangor, Chimney Corner, Dergview, Knockbreda, Limavady United, Newry City, PSNI, Tobermore United and Wakehurst all received byes into the Second Round.

Team 1	Score	Team 2
Annagh United	4–0	Moyola Park
Armagh City	0–2	Sport & Leisure Swifts
Ballinamallard United	3–0	Institute
Ballyclare Comrades	3–0	Ballymoney United
Banbridge Town	0–1	Warrenpoint Town
Dundela	3–4	Larne
Glebe Rangers	2–3	Loughgall
Killymoon Rangers	5–4	Queen's University
Lurgan Celtic	1–3	Harland & Wolff Welders
Portstewart	1–4	Coagh United

== Second round ==
The draw for the second round was made on 2 September 2011. The games were played in a one-leg format on 20 and 21 September 2011.

The 12 members of the IFA Premiership entered at this stage, along with the 10 winners from the First Round matches, and the 10 teams who received byes.

Team 1	Score	Team 2
Ballinamallard United	0–2	Limavady United
Ballyclare Comrades	4–6 (aet)	Linfield
Ballymena United	7–0	Chimney Corner
Bangor	3–2	Annagh United
Carrick Rangers	6–1	Sport & Leisure Swifts
Cliftonville	3–1	Ards
Coleraine	3–1	Knockbreda
Crusaders	6–1	PSNI
Dergview	2–1 (aet)	Harland & Wolff Welders
Donegal Celtic	4–0	Wakehurst
Dungannon Swifts	4–0	Loughgall
Glenavon	10–0	Coagh United
Glentoran	7–0	Killymoon Rangers
Lisburn Distillery	2–0	Tobermore United
Newry City	4–2	Larne
Portadown	3–0	Warrenpoint Town

== Third round ==
The draw for the third round was made on 21 September 2011. The games were played in a one-leg format on 12 October 2011.

Team 1	Score	Team 2
Bangor	0–2	Ballymena United
Carrick Rangers	3–1	Limavady United
Cliftonville	5–0	Dungannon Swifts
Donegal Celtic	0–1	Dergview
Glentoran	2–1	Portadown
Linfield	0–0 (5–6 p)	Glenavon
Lisburn Distillery	2–4	Crusaders
Newry City	0–3	Coleraine

== Quarter-finals ==
The draw for the Quarter-finals was made on 13 October 2011. The games were played on 16 November 2011.

Team 1	Score	Team 2
Carrick Rangers	0–7	Crusaders
Dergview	2–6	Ballymena United
Glenavon	1–2	Cliftonville
Glentoran	1–2	Coleraine

== Semi-finals ==
13 December 2011
19:45 GMT

Cliftonville	1 − 2 (a.e.t.)	Coleraine
R. Donnelly 71' (pen.)	Report	Tommons 10'; Black 119'

Solitude, Belfast

13 December 2011
19:45 GMT

Ballymena United	0 − 1	Crusaders
	Report	Dallas 47'

Ballymena Showgrounds, Ballymena

== Final ==
28 January 2012
14:30 GMT

Coleraine	0 – 1	Crusaders
	Report	Morrow 34'

Ballymena Showgrounds, Ballymena
