= 1990–91 Ulster Cup =

Tournament details
- Country: Northern Ireland
- Teams: 16

Final positions
- Champions: Portadown (1st win)
- Runners-up: Glenavon

Tournament statistics
- Matches played: 32
- Goals scored: 99 (3.09 per match)

The 1990–91 Ulster Cup was the 43rd edition of the Ulster Cup, a cup competition in Northern Irish football.

Portadown won the tournament for the 1st time, defeating Glenavon 3–2 on penalties after both the final replay and original final finished in 1-1 draws.

== Group standings ==
=== Section A ===
Pos	Team	Pld	W	D	L	GF	GA	GD	Pts	Result
1	Portadown	3	3	0	0	8	2	+6	9	Advance to quarter-final
2	Ballymena United	3	1	0	2	6	6	0	3	Advance to quarter-final
3	Crusaders	3	1	0	2	5	6	−1	3	
4	Larne	3	1	0	2	4	9	−5	3	

Source: Irish League Archive

=== Section B ===
Pos	Team	Pld	W	D	L	GF	GA	GD	Pts	Result
1	Glenavon	3	3	0	0	12	2	+10	9	Advance to quarter-final
2	Bangor	3	2	0	1	6	2	+4	6	Advance to quarter-final
3	Carrick Rangers	3	0	1	2	4	11	−7	1	
4	Distillery	3	0	1	2	3	10	−7	1	

Source: Irish League Archive

=== Section C ===
Pos	Team	Pld	W	D	L	GF	GA	GD	Pts	Result
1	Glentoran	3	2	1	0	6	1	+5	7	Advance to quarter-final
2	Coleraine	3	2	0	1	4	3	+1	6	Advance to quarter-final
3	Newry Town	3	1	1	1	4	2	+2	4	
4	Ballyclare Comrades	3	0	0	3	2	10	−8	0	

Source: Irish League Archive

=== Section D ===
Pos	Team	Pld	W	D	L	GF	GA	GD	Pts	Result
1	Cliftonville	3	1	2	0	3	2	+1	5	Advance to quarter-final
2	Linfield	3	1	2	0	2	1	+1	5	Advance to quarter-final
3	Ards	3	1	1	1	3	3	0	4	
4	Omagh Town	3	0	1	2	1	3	−2	1	

Source: Irish League Archive

== Quarter-finals ==
Team 1	Score	Team 2
Cliftonville	1–1 (a.e.t.) (4–5 p)	Coleraine
Glenavon	4–0	Ballymena United
Glentoran	0–1	Linfield
Portadown	2–1	Bangor

== Semi-finals ==
Team 1	Score	Team 2
Glenavon	5–1	Coleraine
Portadown	4–2	Linfield

== Final ==
25 September 1990

Portadown	1–1	Glenavon
Cunningham 43'		Ferguson 70'

The Oval, Belfast
Attendance: 6,000
Referee: Freddie McKnight (Newtownards)

=== Replay ===
23 October 1990

Portadown	1–1 (a.e.t.)	Glenavon
Cunningham 15'; Major (red card) 28'		Ferris 68'
Penalties
Cowan (penalty scored); Doolin (penalty scored); Stewart (penalty missed); Keenan (penalty scored)	3–2	(penalty scored) McBride; (penalty missed) Blackledge; (penalty missed) Campbell; (penalty scored) Ferguson; (penalty missed) Conville

The Oval, Belfast
Referee: Bobby Stewart (Dunmurry)
