= 1983–84 Ulster Cup =

Tournament details
- Country: Northern Ireland
- Teams: 14

Final positions
- Champions: Glentoran (7th win)
- Runners-up: Coleraine

Tournament statistics
- Matches played: 45
- Goals scored: 150 (3.33 per match)

The 1983–84 Ulster Cup was the 36th edition of the Ulster Cup, a cup competition in Northern Irish football.

Glentoran won the tournament for the 7th time and 3rd consecutive season, defeating Coleraine 5–2 in the final.

Similar to the Gold Cup, there was a change in the format of the tournament this season due to two additional clubs competing. Section A clubs played each other twice and played three matches with Section B clubs (and vice versa for Section B clubs). Section C clubs played each other once and played four matches with Section D clubs (and vice versa for Section D clubs). The clubs that topped each section progressed to the semi-finals.

== Group standings ==
=== Section A ===
Pos	Team	Pld	W	D	L	GF	GA	GD	Pts	Result
1	Carrick Rangers	7	3	2	2	16	13	+3	8	Advance to semi-final
2	Ballymena United	7	1	3	3	7	10	−3	5	
3	Distillery	7	0	5	2	12	17	−5	5	

Source: Irish League Archive

=== Section B ===
Pos	Team	Pld	W	D	L	GF	GA	GD	Pts	Result
1	Glentoran	7	6	1	0	17	5	+12	13	Advance to semi-final
2	Linfield	7	3	2	2	10	7	+3	8	
3	Crusaders	7	0	3	4	8	18	−10	3	

Source: Irish League Archive

=== Section C ===
Pos	Team	Pld	W	D	L	GF	GA	GD	Pts	Result
1	Ards	7	5	1	1	10	4	+6	11	Advance to semi-final
2	Coleraine	7	5	1	1	14	7	+7	11	
3	Portadown	7	4	0	3	8	6	+2	8	
4	Glenavon	7	1	2	4	6	12	−6	4	

Source: Irish League Archive

=== Section D ===
Pos	Team	Pld	W	D	L	GF	GA	GD	Pts	Result
1	Newry Town	7	3	1	3	7	10	−3	7	Advance to semi-final
2	Larne	7	3	0	4	9	11	−2	6	
3	Bangor	7	2	1	4	4	7	−3	5	
4	Cliftonville	7	2	0	5	10	11	−1	4	

Source: Irish League Archive

== Semi-finals ==
Team 1	Score	Team 2
Coleraine	1–0	Newry Town
Glentoran	4–0	Carrick Rangers

== Final ==
22 November 1983

Glentoran	5–2 (a.e.t.)	Coleraine
McDowell 58' (o.g.); Blackledge 80', 105', 112', 119'	Report	O'Kane 29'; McCoy 78'

Windsor Park, Belfast
Referee: Oliver Donnelly (Belfast)
