= 1994–95 Ulster Cup =

Tournament details
- Country: Northern Ireland
- Teams: 16

Final positions
- Champions: Bangor (2nd win)
- Runners-up: Linfield

Tournament statistics
- Matches played: 31
- Goals scored: 97 (3.13 per match)

The 1994–95 Ulster Cup was the 47th edition of the Ulster Cup, a cup competition in Northern Irish football.

Bangor won the tournament for the 2nd time, defeating Linfield 2–1 in the final.

== Group standings ==
=== Section A ===
| Pos | Team | Pld | W | D | L | GF | GA | GD | Pts | Result |
|---|---|---|---|---|---|---|---|---|---|---|
| 1 | Bangor | 3 | 2 | 1 | 0 | 6 | 2 | +4 | 7 | Advance to quarter-final |
| 2 | Linfield | 3 | 2 | 0 | 1 | 4 | 3 | +1 | 6 | Advance to quarter-final |
| 3 | Carrick Rangers | 3 | 1 | 0 | 2 | 7 | 7 | 0 | 3 | |
| 4 | Glentoran | 3 | 0 | 1 | 2 | 2 | 7 | −5 | 1 | |

Source: Irish League Archive

=== Section B ===
| Pos | Team | Pld | W | D | L | GF | GA | GD | Pts | Result |
|---|---|---|---|---|---|---|---|---|---|---|
| 1 | Portadown | 3 | 2 | 1 | 0 | 9 | 4 | +5 | 7 | Advance to quarter-final |
| 2 | Newry Town | 3 | 2 | 0 | 1 | 5 | 6 | −1 | 6 | Advance to quarter-final |
| 3 | Coleraine | 3 | 1 | 1 | 1 | 4 | 4 | 0 | 4 | |
| 4 | Ards | 3 | 0 | 0 | 3 | 2 | 6 | −4 | 0 | |

Source: Irish League Archive

=== Section C ===
| Pos | Team | Pld | W | D | L | GF | GA | GD | Pts | Result |
|---|---|---|---|---|---|---|---|---|---|---|
| 1 | Glenavon | 3 | 3 | 0 | 0 | 10 | 1 | +9 | 9 | Advance to quarter-final |
| 2 | Distillery | 3 | 2 | 0 | 1 | 4 | 3 | +1 | 6 | Advance to quarter-final |
| 3 | Larne | 3 | 0 | 1 | 2 | 2 | 6 | −4 | 1 | |
| 4 | Ballymena United | 3 | 0 | 1 | 2 | 1 | 7 | −6 | 1 | |

Source: Irish League Archive

=== Section D ===
| Pos | Team | Pld | W | D | L | GF | GA | GD | Pts | Result |
|---|---|---|---|---|---|---|---|---|---|---|
| 1 | Ballyclare Comrades | 3 | 3 | 0 | 0 | 7 | 3 | +4 | 9 | Advance to quarter-final |
| 2 | Crusaders | 3 | 2 | 0 | 1 | 8 | 3 | +5 | 6 | Advance to quarter-final |
| 3 | Cliftonville | 3 | 0 | 1 | 2 | 2 | 4 | −2 | 1 | |
| 4 | Omagh Town | 3 | 0 | 1 | 2 | 1 | 8 | −7 | 1 | |

Source: Irish League Archive

== Quarter-finals ==
| Team 1 | Score | Team 2 |
|---|---|---|
| Ballyclare Comrades | 1–2 | Distillery |
| Bangor | 1–0 | Newry Town |
| Glenavon | 4–1 | Crusaders |
| Portadown | 0–3 | Linfield |

== Semi-finals ==
| Team 1 | Score | Team 2 |
|---|---|---|
| Bangor | 3–2 | Glenavon |
| Linfield | 2–1 | Distillery |

== Final ==
4 October 1994

| Bangor | 2–1 | Linfield |
|---|---|---|
| Brown 2'; Kenny 76' (pen.) | | Campbell 67' |

The Oval, Belfast
Referee: Alan Snoddy (Carryduff)
