= 1996–97 Ulster Cup =

Tournament details
- Country: Northern Ireland
- Teams: 16

Final positions
- Champions: Coleraine (8th win)
- Runners-up: Crusaders

Tournament statistics
- Matches played: 23
- Goals scored: 76 (3.3 per match)

The 1996–97 Ulster Cup was the 49th edition of the Ulster Cup, a cup competition in Northern Irish football. It was the final edition to feature top-flight clubs.

Coleraine won the tournament for the 8th time, defeating Crusaders 4–3 on penalties after the final finished in a 1–1 draw.

== Results ==
=== First round ===
Teams that were at home in the first leg listed on the left.

Team 1	Agg.	Team 2	1st leg	2nd leg
Ballymena United	3–4	Crusaders	1–1	2–3
Bangor	1–2	Glentoran	0–1	1–1
Carrick Rangers	0–5	Ards	0–2	0–3
Distillery	2–6	Linfield	1–3	1–3
Larne	1–4	Cliftonville	1–4	0–0
Newry Town	3–5	Coleraine	2–3	1–2
Omagh Town	3–4	Glenavon	1–1	2–3
Portadown	2–3	Ballyclare Comrades	2–2	0–1

=== Quarter-finals ===
Team 1	Score	Team 2
Ards	3–4 (a.e.t.)	Glentoran
Cliftonville	4–1	Ballyclare Comrades
Glenavon	1–3	Coleraine
Linfield	2–3	Crusaders

=== Semi-finals ===
Team 1	Score	Team 2
Coleraine	1–0	Glentoran
Crusaders	4–0	Cliftonville

== Final ==
17 September 1996

Coleraine	1–1 (a.e.t.)	Crusaders
McAllister 39'		Brunton 89' (o.g.)
Penalties
McAllister (penalty missed); Brunton (penalty scored); Aspinall (penalty scored); Shiels (penalty scored); Gaston (penalty scored)	4–3	(penalty scored) McMullan; (penalty missed) Morgan; (penalty scored) Baxter; (penalty scored) Dwyer; (penalty missed) McKeown

Windsor Park, Belfast
Referee: Herbie Barr (Bangor)
