= 1986–87 Ulster Cup =

Tournament details
- Country: Northern Ireland
- Teams: 16

Final positions
- Champions: Coleraine (7th win)
- Runners-up: Linfield

Tournament statistics
- Matches played: 31
- Goals scored: 92 (2.97 per match)

The 1986–87 Ulster Cup was the 39th edition of the Ulster Cup, a cup competition in Northern Irish football.

Coleraine won the tournament for the 7th time and 2nd consecutive season, defeating Linfield 1–0 in the final.

== Group standings ==
=== Section A ===
Pos	Team	Pld	W	D	L	GF	GA	GD	Pts	Result
1	Linfield	3	3	0	0	7	1	+6	9	Advance to quarter-final
2	Crusaders	3	2	0	1	8	5	+3	6	Advance to quarter-final
3	Newry Town	3	1	0	2	6	7	−1	3	
4	Distillery	3	0	0	3	2	10	−8	0	

Source: Irish League Archive

=== Section B ===
Pos	Team	Pld	W	D	L	GF	GA	GD	Pts	Result
1	Coleraine	3	2	0	1	6	1	+5	6	Advance to quarter-final
2	Larne	3	2	0	1	7	6	+1	6	Advance to quarter-final
3	Portadown	3	1	1	1	2	3	−1	4	
4	Carrick Rangers	3	0	1	2	4	9	−5	1	

Source: Irish League Archive

=== Section C ===
Pos	Team	Pld	W	D	L	GF	GA	GD	Pts	Result
1	Glenavon	3	2	0	1	10	6	+4	6	Advance to quarter-final
2	Ballymena United	3	2	0	1	6	3	+3	6	Advance to quarter-final
3	Ards	3	2	0	1	6	5	+1	6	
4	Dundela	3	0	0	3	2	10	−8	0	

Source: Irish League Archive

=== Section D ===
Pos	Team	Pld	W	D	L	GF	GA	GD	Pts	Result
1	RUC	3	1	2	0	3	1	+2	5	Advance to quarter-final
2	Glentoran	3	1	2	0	3	2	+1	5	Advance to quarter-final
3	Bangor	3	1	1	1	3	3	0	4	
4	Cliftonville	3	0	1	2	1	4	−3	1	

Source: Irish League Archive

== Quarter-finals ==
Team 1	Score	Team 2
Ballymena United	3–0 (a.e.t.)	Crusaders
Coleraine	3–0	Glentoran
Larne	4–1	RUC
Linfield	1–0	Glenavon

== Semi-finals ==
Team 1	Score	Team 2
Coleraine	0–0 (a.e.t.) (4–2 p)	Larne
Linfield	2–1	Ballymena United

== Final ==
23 September 1986

Coleraine	1–0	Linfield
Wade 84'

The Oval, Belfast
Referee: Andy Ritchie (Carrickfergus)
