= 1991–92 Ulster Cup =

Tournament details
- Country: Northern Ireland
- Teams: 16

Final positions
- Champions: Bangor (1st win)
- Runners-up: Crusaders

Tournament statistics
- Matches played: 31
- Goals scored: 92 (2.97 per match)

The 1991–92 Ulster Cup was the 44th edition of the Ulster Cup, a cup competition in Northern Irish football.

Bangor won the tournament for the 1st time, defeating Crusaders 3–1 in the final.

== Group standings ==
=== Section A ===
Pos	Team	Pld	W	D	L	GF	GA	GD	Pts	Result
1	Ballymena United	3	2	0	1	7	3	+4	6	Advance to quarter-final
2	Portadown	3	2	0	1	7	6	+1	6	Advance to quarter-final
3	Coleraine	3	1	1	1	4	5	−1	4	
4	Ards	3	0	1	2	5	9	−4	1	

Source: Irish League Archive

=== Section B ===
Pos	Team	Pld	W	D	L	GF	GA	GD	Pts	Result
1	Bangor	3	2	0	1	9	3	+6	6	Advance to quarter-final
2	Crusaders	3	2	0	1	6	4	+2	6	Advance to quarter-final
3	Linfield	3	2	0	1	3	2	+1	6	
4	Carrick Rangers	3	0	0	3	2	11	−9	0	

Source: Irish League Archive

=== Section C ===
Pos	Team	Pld	W	D	L	GF	GA	GD	Pts	Result
1	Glentoran	3	3	0	0	9	2	+7	9	Advance to quarter-final
2	Cliftonville	3	2	0	1	4	2	+2	6	Advance to quarter-final
3	Distillery	3	0	1	2	1	5	−4	1	
4	Ballyclare Comrades	3	0	1	2	2	7	−5	1	

Source: Irish League Archive

=== Section D ===
Pos	Team	Pld	W	D	L	GF	GA	GD	Pts	Result
1	Glenavon	3	3	0	0	5	1	+4	9	Advance to quarter-final
2	Newry Town	3	1	1	1	2	2	0	4	Advance to quarter-final
3	Larne	3	1	0	2	4	4	0	3	
4	Omagh Town	3	0	1	2	1	5	−4	1	

Source: Irish League Archive

== Quarter-finals ==
Team 1	Score	Team 2
Ballymena United	1–1 (a.e.t.) (2–4 p)	Crusaders
Bangor	4–0	Portadown
Glenavon	2–1	Cliftonville
Glentoran	5–0	Newry Town

== Semi-finals ==
Team 1	Score	Team 2
Bangor	1–1 (a.e.t.) (5–3 p)	Glenavon
Crusaders	1–0	Glentoran

== Final ==
11 September 1991

Bangor	3–1	Crusaders
McCreadie 44'; McCloskey 54'; Caughey 84'		Gardiner 40'; J. Burrows (red card) 28'

The Oval, Belfast
Referee: Jimmy Duffy (Banbridge)
