= 1989–90 Ulster Cup =

Tournament details
- Country: Northern Ireland
- Teams: 16

Final positions
- Champions: Glentoran (9th win)
- Runners-up: Glenavon

Tournament statistics
- Matches played: 31
- Goals scored: 104 (3.35 per match)

The 1989–90 Ulster Cup was the 42nd edition of the Ulster Cup, a cup competition in Northern Irish football.

Glentoran won the tournament for the 9th time and 2nd consecutive season, defeating Glenavon 3–1 in the final.

== Group standings ==
=== Section A ===
Pos	Team	Pld	W	D	L	GF	GA	GD	Pts	Result
1	Glenavon	3	3	0	0	7	2	+5	9	Advance to quarter-final
2	Linfield	3	1	1	1	3	2	+1	4	Advance to quarter-final
3	Ards	3	1	1	1	5	7	−2	4	
4	Ballymena United	3	0	0	3	3	7	−4	0	

Source: Irish League Archive

=== Section B ===
Pos	Team	Pld	W	D	L	GF	GA	GD	Pts	Result
1	Glentoran	3	3	0	0	8	1	+7	9	Advance to quarter-final
2	Larne	3	1	1	1	4	8	−4	4	Advance to quarter-final
3	Distillery	3	1	0	2	4	5	−1	3	
4	Portadown	3	0	1	2	1	3	−2	1	

Source: Irish League Archive

=== Section C ===
Pos	Team	Pld	W	D	L	GF	GA	GD	Pts	Result
1	Cliftonville	3	2	1	0	7	3	+4	7	Advance to quarter-final
2	Coleraine	3	1	1	1	8	6	+2	4	Advance to quarter-final
3	Ballyclare Comrades	3	1	1	1	2	2	0	4	
4	Newry Town	3	0	1	2	3	9	−6	1	

Source: Irish League Archive

=== Section D ===
Pos	Team	Pld	W	D	L	GF	GA	GD	Pts	Result
1	Carrick Rangers	3	2	1	0	9	5	+4	7	Advance to quarter-final
2	Bangor	3	1	2	0	7	4	+3	5	Advance to quarter-final
3	Crusaders	3	1	1	1	4	5	−1	4	
4	Omagh Town	3	0	0	3	2	8	−6	0	

Source: Irish League Archive

== Quarter-finals ==
Team 1	Score	Team 2
Carrick Rangers	0–2	Coleraine
Cliftonville	3–0	Bangor
Glenavon	2–0	Larne
Glentoran	3–1	Linfield

== Semi-finals ==
Team 1	Score	Team 2
Glenavon	5–3	Cliftonville
Glentoran	4–0	Coleraine

== Final ==
3 October 1989

Glentoran	3–1	Glenavon
Macartney 4', 31'; Caskey 25'		Blackledge 59'

Windsor Park, Belfast
Referee: Alan Snoddy (Carryduff)
