= 1992–93 Ulster Cup =

Tournament details
- Country: Northern Ireland
- Teams: 16

Final positions
- Champions: Linfield (15th win)
- Runners-up: Ards

Tournament statistics
- Matches played: 31
- Goals scored: 104 (3.35 per match)

The 1992–93 Ulster Cup was the 45th edition of the Ulster Cup, a cup competition in Northern Irish football.

Linfield won the tournament for the 15th time, defeating Ards 2–0 in the final.

== Group standings ==
=== Section A ===
Pos	Team	Pld	W	D	L	GF	GA	GD	Pts	Result
1	Bangor	3	3	0	0	7	3	+4	9	Advance to quarter-final
2	Omagh Town	3	2	0	1	8	8	0	6	Advance to quarter-final
3	Glentoran	3	1	0	2	6	7	−1	3	
4	Carrick Rangers	3	0	0	3	4	7	−3	0	

Source: Irish League Archive

=== Section B ===
Pos	Team	Pld	W	D	L	GF	GA	GD	Pts	Result
1	Ards	3	3	0	0	11	1	+10	9	Advance to quarter-final
2	Portadown	3	2	0	1	7	3	+4	6	Advance to quarter-final
3	Ballymena United	3	1	0	2	2	9	−7	3	
4	Distillery	3	0	0	3	0	7	−7	0	

Source: Irish League Archive

=== Section C ===
Pos	Team	Pld	W	D	L	GF	GA	GD	Pts	Result
1	Linfield	3	2	1	0	6	4	+2	7	Advance to quarter-final
2	Crusaders	3	2	0	1	12	5	+7	6	Advance to quarter-final
3	Ballyclare Comrades	3	1	1	1	5	7	−2	4	
4	Newry Town	3	0	0	3	3	10	−7	0	

Source: Irish League Archive

=== Section D ===
Pos	Team	Pld	W	D	L	GF	GA	GD	Pts	Result
1	Glenavon	3	2	1	0	6	1	+5	7	Advance to quarter-final
2	Coleraine	3	1	2	0	5	3	+2	5	Advance to quarter-final
3	Cliftonville	3	1	0	2	5	5	0	3	
4	Larne	3	0	1	2	1	8	−7	1	

Source: Irish League Archive

== Quarter-finals ==
Team 1	Score	Team 2
Ards	1–1 (a.e.t.) (3–1 p)	Omagh Town
Bangor	0–0 (a.e.t.) (2–3 p)	Portadown
Glenavon	3–2	Crusaders
Linfield	1–0	Coleraine

== Semi-finals ==
Team 1	Score	Team 2
Ards	1–0	Glenavon
Linfield	3–2	Portadown

== Final ==
23 September 1992

Linfield	2–0	Ards
Campbell 25'; Johnston 62'

The Oval, Belfast
Referee: Alan Snoddy (Carryduff)
