= 1984–85 Ulster Cup =

Tournament details
- Country: Northern Ireland
- Teams: 14

Final positions
- Champions: Linfield (14th win)
- Runners-up: Larne

Tournament statistics
- Matches played: 45
- Goals scored: 151 (3.36 per match)

The 1984–85 Ulster Cup was the 37th edition of the Ulster Cup, a cup competition in Northern Irish football.

Linfield won the tournament for the 14th time, defeating Larne 3–2 on penalties in the final, after the match finished in a 2–2 draw.

== Group standings ==
=== Section A ===
Pos	Team	Pld	W	D	L	GF	GA	GD	Pts	Result
1	Ballymena United	7	4	1	2	12	7	+5	9	Advance to semi-final
2	Distillery	7	3	0	4	12	16	−4	6	
3	Carrick Rangers	7	1	1	5	7	15	−8	3	

Source: Irish League Archive

=== Section B ===
Pos	Team	Pld	W	D	L	GF	GA	GD	Pts	Result
1	Linfield	7	5	1	1	15	7	+8	11	Advance to semi-final
2	Crusaders	7	3	2	2	17	10	+7	8	
3	Glentoran	9	2	1	6	6	15	−9	5	

Source: Irish League Archive

=== Section C ===
Pos	Team	Pld	W	D	L	GF	GA	GD	Pts	Result
1	Portadown	7	6	0	1	15	5	+10	12	Advance to semi-final
2	Glenavon	7	4	1	2	13	9	+4	9	
3	Ards	7	3	1	3	9	10	−1	7	
4	Coleraine	7	3	0	4	10	9	+1	6	

Source: Irish League Archive

=== Section D ===
Pos	Team	Pld	W	D	L	GF	GA	GD	Pts	Result
1	Larne	7	3	3	1	10	6	+4	9	Advance to semi-final
2	Cliftonville	7	2	1	4	9	7	+2	5	
3	Newry Town	7	1	3	3	8	17	−9	5	
4	Bangor	8	1	1	6	3	15	−12	3	

Source: Irish League Archive

== Semi-finals ==
Team 1	Score	Team 2
Larne	3–1	Ballymena United
Linfield	1–0	Portadown

== Final ==
4 December 1984

Linfield	2–2 (a.e.t.)	Larne
McLaughlin 42' (o.g.); McGaughey 80'		Sloan 65'; Smyth 72'
Penalties
Dornan (penalty scored); McGaughey (penalty missed); Doherty (penalty scored); Crawford (penalty missed); Dunlop (penalty scored)	5–4	(penalty scored) Smyth; (penalty missed) Sloan; (penalty missed) Dempsey; (penalty scored) Reid; (penalty missed) McMullan

The Oval, Belfast
Referee: Jack Poucher (Newry)
