= 1995–96 Ulster Cup =

Tournament details
- Country: Northern Ireland
- Teams: 16

Final positions
- Champions: Portadown (2nd win)
- Runners-up: Linfield

Tournament statistics
- Matches played: 31
- Goals scored: 101 (3.26 per match)

The 1995–96 Ulster Cup was the 48th edition of the Ulster Cup, a cup competition in Northern Irish football.

Portadown won the tournament for the 2nd time, defeating Linfield 5–3 on penalties after the final finished in a 2–2 draw.

== Group standings ==
=== Section A ===
Pos	Team	Pld	W	D	L	GF	GA	GD	Pts	Result
1	Crusaders	3	2	0	1	8	4	+4	6	Advance to quarter-final
2	Glentoran	3	2	0	1	7	6	+1	6	Advance to quarter-final
3	Omagh Town	3	1	1	1	6	6	0	4	
4	Carrick Rangers	3	0	1	2	5	10	−5	1	

Source: Irish League Archive

=== Section B ===
Pos	Team	Pld	W	D	L	GF	GA	GD	Pts	Result
1	Glenavon	3	3	0	0	9	0	+9	9	Advance to quarter-final
2	Distillery	3	2	0	1	7	1	+6	6	Advance to quarter-final
3	Cliftonville	3	1	0	2	7	4	+3	3	
4	Ballyclare Comrades	3	0	0	3	1	19	−18	0	

Source: Irish League Archive

=== Section C ===
Pos	Team	Pld	W	D	L	GF	GA	GD	Pts	Result
1	Coleraine	3	2	1	0	5	1	+4	7	Advance to quarter-final
2	Portadown	3	2	0	1	7	2	+5	6	Advance to quarter-final
3	Bangor	3	1	1	1	3	6	−3	4	
4	Newry Town	3	0	0	3	1	7	−6	0	

Source: Irish League Archive

=== Section D ===
Pos	Team	Pld	W	D	L	GF	GA	GD	Pts	Result
1	Ards	3	3	0	0	7	0	+7	9	Advance to quarter-final
2	Linfield	3	2	0	1	5	2	+3	6	Advance to quarter-final
3	Ballymena United	3	1	0	2	1	7	−6	3	
4	Larne	3	0	0	3	0	4	−4	0	

Source: Irish League Archive

== Quarter-finals ==
Team 1	Score	Team 2
Ards	1–2	Portadown
Coleraine	0–1	Linfield
Crusaders	1–1 (a.e.t.) (6–5 p)	Distillery
Glenavon	2–0	Glentoran

== Semi-finals ==
Team 1	Score	Team 2
Glenavon	2–3	Portadown
Linfield	3–2	Crusaders

== Final ==
16 January 1996

Linfield	2–2 (a.e.t.)	Portadown
McCoosh 86'; Fenlon 100'		Haylock 72'; Peebles 93'
Penalties
Fenlon (penalty scored); Beatty (penalty scored); Erskine (penalty scored); Bailie (penalty missed)	3–5	(penalty scored) Haylock; (penalty scored) Kennedy; (penalty scored) Casey; (penalty scored) Peebles; (penalty scored) Candlish

Windsor Park, Belfast
Referee: David Magill (Belfast)
