= 1955–56 Ulster Cup =

Tournament details
- Country: Northern Ireland
- Teams: 12

Final positions
- Champions: Linfield (2nd win)
- Runners-up: Coleraine

Tournament statistics
- Matches played: 31
- Goals scored: 103 (3.32 per match)

The 1955–56 Ulster Cup was the eighth edition of the Ulster Cup, a cup competition in Northern Irish football.

Linfield won the tournament for the 2nd time, defeating Coleraine 5–1 in the final.

== Group standings ==
=== Section A ===
| Pos | Team | Pld | W | D | L | GF | GA | GR | Pts | Result |
|---|---|---|---|---|---|---|---|---|---|---|
| 1 | Linfield | 5 | 3 | 1 | 1 | 10 | 8 | 1.250 | 7 | Advance to final |
| 2 | Ards | 5 | 2 | 2 | 1 | 8 | 4 | 2.000 | 6 | |
| 3 | Distillery | 5 | 2 | 2 | 1 | 9 | 7 | 1.286 | 6 | |
| 4 | Bangor | 5 | 2 | 1 | 2 | 7 | 8 | 0.875 | 5 | |
| 5 | Glenavon | 5 | 2 | 0 | 3 | 9 | 12 | 0.750 | 4 | |
| 6 | Portadown | 5 | 1 | 0 | 4 | 5 | 9 | 0.556 | 2 | |

Source: Irish League Archive

=== Section B ===
| Pos | Team | Pld | W | D | L | GF | GA | GR | Pts | Result |
|---|---|---|---|---|---|---|---|---|---|---|
| 1 | Coleraine | 5 | 3 | 2 | 0 | 11 | 7 | 1.571 | 8 | Advance to final |
| 2 | Cliftonville | 5 | 3 | 1 | 1 | 11 | 6 | 1.833 | 7 | |
| 3 | Derry City | 5 | 2 | 1 | 2 | 12 | 9 | 1.333 | 5 | |
| 4 | Crusaders | 5 | 1 | 3 | 1 | 4 | 5 | 0.800 | 5 | |
| 5 | Glentoran | 5 | 1 | 1 | 3 | 7 | 11 | 0.636 | 3 | |
| 6 | Ballymena United | 5 | 1 | 0 | 4 | 4 | 11 | 0.364 | 2 | |

Source: Irish League Archive

== Final ==
12 October 1955

| Linfield | 5–1 | Coleraine |
|---|---|---|
| Kennedy; Weatherup; Maguire | Report | Coyle |

The Oval, Belfast
