= 1957–58 Ulster Cup =

Tournament details
- Country: Northern Ireland
- Teams: 12

Final positions
- Champions: Distillery (1st win)
- Runners-up: Glentoran

Tournament statistics
- Matches played: 33
- Goals scored: 138 (4.18 per match)

The 1957–58 Ulster Cup was the tenth edition of the Ulster Cup, a cup competition in Northern Irish football.

Distillery won the tournament for the 1st time, defeating Glentoran 4–1 in the final replay after the original final ended in a 1–1 draw.

== Group standings ==
=== Section A ===
Pos	Team	Pld	W	D	L	GF	GA	GR	Pts	Result
1	Linfield	5	3	2	0	12	3	4.000	8	
2	Distillery	5	3	2	0	13	5	2.600	8	Advance to final
3	Glenavon	5	2	2	1	17	9	1.889	6	
4	Ards	5	2	1	2	15	13	1.154	5	
5	Bangor	5	0	2	3	6	17	0.353	2	
6	Portadown	5	0	1	4	5	21	0.238	1	

Source: Irish League Archive

==== Playoff ====
- Linfield 0–2 Distillery

=== Section B ===
Pos	Team	Pld	W	D	L	GF	GA	GR	Pts	Result
1	Glentoran	5	4	0	1	15	9	1.667	8	Advance to final
2	Derry City	5	2	3	0	9	7	1.286	7	
3	Coleraine	5	2	2	1	14	12	1.167	6	
4	Cliftonville	5	1	2	2	10	12	0.833	4	
5	Crusaders	5	1	2	2	6	9	0.667	4	
6	Ballymena United	5	0	1	4	7	12	0.583	1	

Source: Irish League Archive

== Final ==
17 September 1957

Distillery	1–1	Glentoran
Hamilton 21'	Report	Fogarty 30' (pen.)

Solitude, Belfast

=== Replay ===
23 September 1957

Distillery	4–1	Glentoran
Shiels 10', 65'; Lunn 46'; McQuilken 66'	Report	Fogarty 60'

Windsor Park, Belfast
