= 1953–54 Ulster Cup =

Tournament details
- Country: Northern Ireland
- Teams: 12

Final positions
- Champions: Crusaders (1st win)
- Runners-up: Linfield

Tournament statistics
- Matches played: 61
- Goals scored: 242 (3.97 per match)

The 1953–54 Ulster Cup was the sixth edition of the Ulster Cup, a cup competition in Northern Irish football.

Crusaders won the tournament for the 1st time, defeating Linfield 2–1 in the final.

== Group standings ==
=== Section A ===
Pos	Team	Pld	W	D	L	GF	GA	GR	Pts	Result
1	Linfield	10	8	0	2	29	13	2.231	16	Advance to final
2	Distillery	10	4	3	3	24	17	1.412	11	
3	Ards	10	3	5	2	17	17	1.000	11	
4	Portadown	10	3	2	5	17	23	0.739	8	
5	Glenavon	10	3	1	6	21	27	0.778	7	
6	Bangor	10	3	1	6	19	30	0.633	7	

Source: Irish League Archive

=== Section B ===
Pos	Team	Pld	W	D	L	GF	GA	GR	Pts	Result
1	Crusaders	10	7	2	1	21	11	1.909	16	Advance to final
2	Glentoran	10	5	4	1	28	17	1.647	14	
3	Coleraine	10	4	2	4	18	18	1.000	10	
4	Derry City	10	2	4	4	15	23	0.652	8	
5	Ballymena United	10	2	2	6	16	21	0.762	6	
6	Cliftonville	10	3	0	7	14	22	0.636	6	

Source: Irish League Archive

== Final ==
29 September 1953

Crusaders	2–1	Linfield
Tully 42'; Shields 80'	Report	Lunn 16'

Solitude, Belfast
