= 1998–99 Ulster Cup =

Tournament details
- Country: Northern Ireland
- Teams: 8

Final positions
- Champions: Distillery (2nd win)
- Runners-up: Ards

Tournament statistics
- Matches played: 28
- Goals scored: 79 (2.82 per match)

The 1998–99 Ulster Cup was the 51st edition of the Ulster Cup, a cup competition in Northern Irish football. This edition featured only clubs from the First Division.

Distillery won the tournament for the 2nd time, finishing top of the group standings.

== Group standings ==
Pos	Team	Pld	W	D	L	GF	GA	GD	Pts	Result
1	Distillery (C)	7	4	1	2	10	6	+4	13	Champions
2	Ards	7	4	0	3	14	10	+4	12	
3	Bangor	7	3	3	1	9	6	+3	12	
4	Limavady United	7	3	1	3	6	9	−3	10	
5	Dungannon Swifts	7	2	3	2	14	8	+6	9	
6	Ballyclare Comrades	7	3	0	4	9	18	−9	9	
7	Carrick Rangers	7	2	1	4	9	12	−3	7	
8	Larne	7	1	3	3	8	10	−2	6	

Source: Irish League Archive
(C) Champions
