= 1975–76 Ulster Cup =

Tournament details
- Country: Northern Ireland
- Teams: 12

Final positions
- Champions: Coleraine (5th win)
- Runners-up: Linfield

Tournament statistics
- Matches played: 66
- Goals scored: 223 (3.38 per match)

The 1975–76 Ulster Cup was the 28th edition of the Ulster Cup, a cup competition in Northern Irish football.

Coleraine won the tournament for the 5th time, finishing top of the group standings.

== Group standings ==
Pos	Team	Pld	W	D	L	GF	GA	GR	Pts	Result
1	Coleraine (C)	11	8	3	0	32	5	6.400	19	Champions
2	Linfield	11	7	2	2	20	7	2.857	16	
3	Glentoran	11	7	2	2	25	13	1.923	16	
4	Portadown	11	6	1	4	22	23	0.957	13	
5	Bangor	11	5	2	4	18	17	1.059	12	
6	Glenavon	11	3	4	4	14	20	0.700	10	
7	Ballymena United	11	4	1	6	13	15	0.867	9	
8	Ards	11	3	3	5	15	18	0.833	9	
9	Crusaders	11	2	5	4	15	26	0.577	9	
10	Distillery	11	2	4	5	15	24	0.625	8	
11	Cliftonville	11	3	0	8	13	24	0.542	6	
12	Larne	11	1	3	7	21	31	0.677	5	

Source: Irish League Archive
(C) Champions
