= 1976–77 Ulster Cup =

Tournament details
- Country: Northern Ireland
- Teams: 12

Final positions
- Champions: Glentoran (4th win)
- Runners-up: Portadown

Tournament statistics
- Matches played: 66
- Goals scored: 238 (3.61 per match)

The 1976–77 Ulster Cup was the 29th edition of the Ulster Cup, a cup competition in Northern Irish football.

Glentoran won the tournament for the 4th time, finishing top of the group standings.

== Group standings ==
Pos	Team	Pld	W	D	L	GF	GA	GD	Pts	Result
1	Glentoran (C)	11	8	1	2	36	14	+22	17	Champions
2	Portadown	11	8	1	2	30	14	+16	17	
3	Linfield	11	8	1	2	25	20	+5	17	
4	Larne	11	6	2	3	19	11	+8	14	
5	Coleraine	11	5	3	3	17	16	+1	13	
6	Glenavon	11	4	3	4	17	16	+1	11	
7	Bangor	11	4	2	5	20	26	−6	10	
8	Cliftonville	11	4	0	7	14	19	−5	8	
9	Crusaders	11	3	2	6	21	28	−7	8	
10	Ards	11	3	2	6	15	26	−11	8	
11	Distillery	11	3	1	7	15	23	−8	7	
12	Ballymena United	11	0	2	9	9	25	−16	2	

Source: Irish League Archive
(C) Champions
