= 1973–74 Ulster Cup =

Tournament details
- Country: Northern Ireland
- Teams: 12

Final positions
- Champions: Ards (1st win)
- Runners-up: Linfield

Tournament statistics
- Matches played: 66
- Goals scored: 260 (3.94 per match)

The 1973–74 Ulster Cup was the 26th edition of the Ulster Cup, a cup competition in Northern Irish football.

Ards won the tournament for the 1st time, finishing top of the group standings.

== Group standings ==
Pos	Team	Pld	W	D	L	GF	GA	GR	Pts	Result
1	Ards (C)	11	9	1	1	37	11	3.364	19	Champions
2	Linfield	11	8	2	1	36	12	3.000	18	
3	Bangor	11	6	2	3	23	13	1.769	14	
4	Portadown	11	6	1	4	29	18	1.611	13	
5	Coleraine	11	6	0	5	28	25	1.120	12	
6	Ballymena United	11	5	2	4	20	22	0.909	12	
7	Glentoran	11	6	0	5	17	19	0.895	12	
8	Crusaders	11	3	4	4	14	16	0.875	10	
9	Larne	11	3	1	7	11	30	0.367	7	
10	Distillery	11	2	2	7	16	22	0.727	6	
11	Glenavon	11	3	0	8	19	38	0.500	6	
12	Cliftonville	11	1	1	9	11	35	0.314	3	

Source: Irish League Archive
(C) Champions
