= 2002–03 Ulster Cup =

Tournament details
- Country: Northern Ireland
- Teams: 8

Final positions
- Champions: Dungannon Swifts (1st win)
- Runners-up: Ballymena United

Tournament statistics
- Matches played: 28
- Goals scored: 89 (3.18 per match)

The 2002–03 Ulster Cup was the 52nd and final edition of the Ulster Cup, a cup competition in Northern Irish football. This edition featured only clubs from the First Division.

Dungannon Swifts won the tournament for the 1st time, finishing top of the group standings.

== Group standings ==
| Pos | Team | Pld | W | D | L | GF | GA | GD | Pts | Result |
|---|---|---|---|---|---|---|---|---|---|---|
| 1 | Dungannon Swifts (C) | 7 | 6 | 1 | 0 | 14 | 3 | +11 | 19 | Champions |
| 2 | Ballymena United | 7 | 4 | 2 | 1 | 17 | 6 | +11 | 14 | |
| 3 | Larne | 7 | 4 | 1 | 2 | 12 | 6 | +6 | 13 | |
| 4 | Limavady United | 7 | 3 | 1 | 3 | 12 | 8 | +4 | 10 | |
| 5 | Bangor | 7 | 3 | 0 | 4 | 8 | 13 | −5 | 9 | |
| 6 | Carrick Rangers | 7 | 1 | 3 | 3 | 5 | 10 | −5 | 6 | |
| 7 | Ballyclare Comrades | 7 | 1 | 2 | 4 | 13 | 22 | −9 | 5 | |
| 8 | Armagh City | 7 | 0 | 2 | 5 | 8 | 21 | −13 | 2 | |

Source: Irish League Archive
(C) Champions
