= 1983–84 Gold Cup =

Tournament details
- Country: Northern Ireland
- Teams: 14

Final positions
- Champions: Linfield (28th win)
- Runners-up: Glentoran

Tournament statistics
- Matches played: 52
- Goals scored: 167 (3.21 per match)

The 1983–84 Gold Cup was the 65th edition of the Gold Cup, a cup competition in Northern Irish football.

The tournament was won by Linfield for the 28th time, defeating Glentoran 3–1 in the final at Windsor Park.

For this edition, there was a change in the format of the group stage. Section A clubs played each other twice and played three matches with Section B clubs (and vice versa for Section B clubs). Section C clubs played each other once and played four matches with Section D clubs (and vice versa for Section D clubs). The clubs that topped each section progressed to the semi-finals.

== Group standings ==
=== Section A ===
Pos	Team	Pld	W	D	L	GF	GA	GD	Pts	Result
1	Glentoran	7	5	0	2	27	6	+21	10	Advance to semi-final
2	Ards	7	3	1	3	12	13	−1	7	
3	Bangor	7	1	0	6	4	28	−24	2	

Source: Irish League Archive

=== Section B ===
Pos	Team	Pld	W	D	L	GF	GA	GD	Pts	Result
1	Glenavon	7	5	1	1	12	8	+4	11	Advance to semi-final
2	Portadown	7	3	1	3	11	8	+3	7	
3	Newry Town	7	2	1	4	10	13	−3	5	

Source: Irish League Archive

=== Section C ===
Pos	Team	Pld	W	D	L	GF	GA	GD	Pts	Result
1	Coleraine	7	3	2	2	14	8	+6	8	Advance to semi-final
2	Ballymena United	7	3	1	3	9	11	−2	7	
3	Carrick Rangers	7	1	2	4	3	7	−4	4	
4	Larne	7	1	1	5	6	22	−16	3	

Source: Irish League Archive

=== Section D ===
Pos	Team	Pld	W	D	L	GF	GA	GD	Pts	Result
1	Linfield	7	6	1	0	21	5	+16	13	Advance to semi-final
2	Cliftonville	7	4	2	1	17	8	+9	10	
3	Distillery	7	3	2	2	10	10	0	8	
4	Crusaders	7	1	1	5	7	16	−9	3	

Source: Irish League Archive

== Semi-finals ==
Team 1	Score	Team 2
Glentoran	3–3 (a.e.t.) (5–4 p)	Glenavon
Linfield	3–0	Coleraine

== Final ==
18 October 1983

Linfield	3–1	Glentoran
McGaughey 3'; Anderson 43', 66'	Report	Blackledge 79'

Windsor Park, Belfast
Referee: Freddie McKnight (Newtownards)
