= 1961–62 Ulster Cup =

Tournament details
- Country: Northern Ireland
- Teams: 12

Final positions
- Champions: Linfield (5th win)
- Runners-up: Glentoran

Tournament statistics
- Matches played: 34
- Goals scored: 120 (3.53 per match)

The 1961–62 Ulster Cup was the 14th edition of the Ulster Cup, a cup competition in Northern Irish football.

Linfield won the tournament for the 5th time, defeating Glentoran 2–0 in the final.

== Group standings ==
=== Section A ===
Pos	Team	Pld	W	D	L	GF	GA	GR	Pts	Result
1	Portadown	5	4	0	1	8	3	2.667	8	
2	Linfield	5	4	0	1	16	7	2.286	8	Advance to final
3	Glenavon	5	2	1	2	8	8	1.000	5	
4	Distillery	5	2	1	2	14	16	0.875	5	
5	Bangor	5	0	2	3	9	14	0.643	2	
6	Ards	5	1	0	4	8	15	0.533	2	

Source: Irish League Archive

==== Playoff ====
- Linfield 3–3 Portadown

===== Replay =====
- Linfield 1–0 Portadown

=== Section B ===
Pos	Team	Pld	W	D	L	GF	GA	GR	Pts	Result
1	Glentoran	5	4	0	1	12	5	2.400	8	Advance to final
2	Crusaders	5	3	2	0	7	3	2.333	8	
3	Coleraine	5	2	2	1	10	7	1.429	6	
4	Ballymena United	5	1	2	2	8	10	0.800	4	
5	Derry City	5	1	1	3	6	9	0.667	3	
6	Cliftonville	5	0	1	4	2	11	0.182	1	

Source: Irish League Archive

==== Playoff ====
- Glentoran 2–1 Crusaders

== Final ==
14 November 1961

Linfield	2–0	Glentoran
Stewart 15'; Barr 44'	Report

Windsor Park, Belfast
Attendance: 15,000
