= 1979–80 Ulster Cup =

Tournament details
- Country: Northern Ireland
- Teams: 12

Final positions
- Champions: Linfield (13th win)
- Runners-up: Cliftonville

Tournament statistics
- Matches played: 66
- Goals scored: 211 (3.2 per match)

The 1979–80 Ulster Cup was the 32nd edition of the Ulster Cup, a cup competition in Northern Irish football.

Linfield won the tournament for the 13th time and 3rd consecutive season, finishing top of the group standings.

== Group standings ==
Pos	Team	Pld	W	D	L	GF	GA	GD	Pts	Result
1	Linfield (C)	11	7	3	1	37	15	+22	17	Champions
2	Cliftonville	11	5	6	0	20	10	+10	16	
3	Ballymena United	11	6	4	1	18	9	+9	16	
4	Crusaders	11	6	2	3	17	13	+4	14	
5	Glentoran	11	5	3	3	16	11	+5	13	
6	Coleraine	11	4	2	5	21	17	+4	10	
7	Glenavon	11	5	0	6	17	19	−2	10	
8	Bangor	11	3	4	4	16	21	−5	10	
9	Portadown	11	3	3	5	14	21	−7	9	
10	Ards	11	3	1	7	17	26	−9	7	
11	Larne	11	2	2	7	10	19	−9	6	
12	Distillery	11	1	2	8	8	30	−22	4	

Source: Irish League Archive
(C) Champions
