= 1978–79 Ulster Cup =

Tournament details
- Country: Northern Ireland
- Teams: 12

Final positions
- Champions: Linfield (12th win)
- Runners-up: Crusaders

Tournament statistics
- Matches played: 66
- Goals scored: 210 (3.18 per match)

The 1978–79 Ulster Cup was the 31st edition of the Ulster Cup, a cup competition in Northern Irish football.

Linfield won the tournament for the 12th time and 2nd consecutive season, finishing top of the group standings.

== Group standings ==
Pos	Team	Pld	W	D	L	GF	GA	GD	Pts	Result
1	Linfield (C)	11	8	1	2	28	12	+16	17	Champions
2	Crusaders	11	6	3	2	21	16	+5	15	
3	Ballymena United	11	6	2	3	19	14	+5	14	
4	Cliftonville	11	5	4	2	15	11	+4	14	
5	Glenavon	11	4	5	2	21	20	+1	13	
6	Glentoran	11	4	4	3	15	12	+3	12	
7	Larne	11	3	3	5	16	16	0	9	
8	Portadown	11	2	5	4	18	19	−1	9	
9	Bangor	11	3	2	6	16	23	−7	8	
10	Coleraine	11	3	2	6	19	26	−7	8	
11	Ards	11	0	7	4	13	18	−5	7	
12	Distillery	11	1	4	6	9	23	−14	6	

Source: Irish League Archive
(C) Champions
