= 1950–51 Ulster Cup =

Tournament details
- Country: Northern Ireland
- Teams: 16

Final positions
- Champions: Glentoran (1st win)
- Runners-up: Linfield

Tournament statistics
- Matches played: 32
- Goals scored: 118 (3.69 per match)

The 1950–51 Ulster Cup was the third edition of the Ulster Cup, a cup competition in Northern Irish football.

Glentoran won the tournament for the 1st time, defeating Linfield 2–1 in the final.

== Group stage ==
=== Section A ===
Pos	Team	Pld	W	D	L	GF	GA	GR	Pts	Result
1	Coleraine	3	3	0	0	10	2	5.000	6	Advance to semi-final
2	Ballymena United	3	2	0	1	7	2	3.500	4	
3	Derry City	3	1	0	2	4	6	0.667	2	
4	Ulsterville	3	0	0	3	2	13	0.154	0	

Source: Irish League Archive

=== Section B ===
Pos	Team	Pld	W	D	L	GF	GA	GR	Pts	Result
1	Glentoran	3	2	1	0	12	3	4.000	5	Advance to semi-final
2	Ards	3	2	1	0	10	5	2.000	5	
3	Dundela	3	1	0	2	3	9	0.333	2	
4	Bangor	3	0	0	3	2	10	0.200	0	

Source: Irish League Archive

==== Playoff ====
- Glentoran 2–0 Ards

=== Section C ===
Pos	Team	Pld	W	D	L	GF	GA	GR	Pts	Result
1	Linfield	3	2	1	0	11	5	2.200	5	Advance to semi-final
2	Glenavon	3	2	1	0	6	2	3.000	5	
3	Portadown	3	1	0	2	5	11	0.455	2	
4	Brantwood	3	0	0	3	5	9	0.556	0	

Source: Irish League Archive

==== Playoff ====
- Linfield 0–0 Glenavon

===== Replay =====
- Linfield 4–1 Glenavon

=== Section D ===
Pos	Team	Pld	W	D	L	GF	GA	GR	Pts	Result
1	Cliftonville	3	2	1	0	5	3	1.667	5	Advance to semi-final
2	Larne	3	2	1	0	8	5	1.600	5	
3	Crusaders	3	1	0	2	3	4	0.750	2	
4	Distillery	3	0	0	3	1	5	0.200	0	

Source: Irish League Archive

==== Playoff ====
- Cliftonville 2–1 Larne

== Semi-finals ==
Team 1	Score	Team 2
Glentoran	4–1	Cliftonville
Linfield	2–2	Coleraine

=== Replay ===
Team 1	Score	Team 2
Linfield	2–0	Coleraine

== Final ==
10 January 1951

Glentoran	2–1	Linfield
Hughes 26'; Cunningham 29'	Report	McDowell 34'

Grosvenor Park, Belfast
Referee: J. S. Cox (Rutherglen)
