= 1982–83 Ulster Cup =

Tournament details
- Country: Northern Ireland
- Teams: 12

Final positions
- Champions: Glentoran (6th win)
- Runners-up: Linfield

Tournament statistics
- Matches played: 66
- Goals scored: 222 (3.36 per match)

The 1982–83 Ulster Cup was the 35th edition of the Ulster Cup, a cup competition in Northern Irish football.

Glentoran won the tournament for the 6th time and 2nd consecutive season, finishing top of the group standings.

== Group standings ==
Pos	Team	Pld	W	D	L	GF	GA	GD	Pts	Result
1	Glentoran (C)	11	9	1	1	31	13	+18	19	Champions
2	Linfield	11	7	2	2	27	10	+17	16	
3	Coleraine	11	7	1	3	24	16	+8	15	
4	Ballymena United	11	5	3	3	25	14	+11	13	
5	Ards	11	4	5	2	18	15	+3	13	
6	Crusaders	11	5	3	3	21	21	0	13	
7	Cliftonville	11	4	3	4	16	17	−1	11	
8	Larne	11	3	4	4	13	17	−4	10	
9	Glenavon	11	2	3	6	10	17	−7	7	
10	Portadown	11	3	1	7	15	25	−10	7	
11	Distillery	11	2	3	6	12	24	−12	7	
12	Bangor	11	0	1	10	10	33	−23	1	

Source: Irish League Archive
(C) Champions
