= 1985–86 Ulster Cup =

Tournament details
- Country: Northern Ireland
- Teams: 16

Final positions
- Champions: Coleraine (6th win)
- Runners-up: Portadown

Tournament statistics
- Matches played: 31
- Goals scored: 106 (3.42 per match)

The 1985–86 Ulster Cup was the 38th edition of the Ulster Cup, a cup competition in Northern Irish football.

Coleraine won the tournament for the 6th time, defeating Portadown 5–0 in the final.

== Group standings ==
=== Section A ===
Pos	Team	Pld	W	D	L	GF	GA	GD	Pts	Result
1	Linfield	3	3	0	0	10	1	+9	6	Advance to quarter-final
2	Cliftonville	3	1	1	1	8	4	+4	3	Advance to quarter-final
3	Distillery	3	1	1	1	7	7	0	3	
4	Bangor	3	0	0	3	0	13	−13	0	

Source: Irish League Archive

=== Section B ===
Pos	Team	Pld	W	D	L	GF	GA	GD	Pts	Result
1	Coleraine	3	2	1	0	8	6	+2	5	Advance to quarter-final
2	Larne	3	1	1	1	4	3	+1	3	Advance to quarter-final
3	Crusaders	3	1	0	2	7	7	0	2	
4	Carrick Rangers	3	1	0	2	3	6	−3	2	

Source: Irish League Archive

=== Section C ===
Pos	Team	Pld	W	D	L	GF	GA	GD	Pts	Result
1	Glentoran	3	2	1	0	7	3	+4	5	Advance to quarter-final
2	Glenavon	3	2	0	1	5	4	+1	4	Advance to quarter-final
3	Ards	3	1	0	2	4	7	−3	2	
4	Chimney Corner	3	0	1	2	2	4	−2	1	

Source: Irish League Archive

=== Section D ===
Pos	Team	Pld	W	D	L	GF	GA	GD	Pts	Result
1	Portadown	3	2	1	0	7	4	+3	5	Advance to quarter-final
2	Dundela	3	1	2	0	4	1	+3	4	Advance to quarter-final
3	Newry Town	3	1	0	2	6	9	−3	2	
4	Ballymena United	3	0	1	2	3	6	−3	1	

Source: Irish League Archive

== Quarter-finals ==
Team 1	Score	Team 2
Coleraine	2–0	Dundela
Glentoran	2–2 (a.e.t.) (4–2 p)	Cliftonville
Linfield	1–0 (a.e.t.)	Glenavon
Portadown	3–1 (a.e.t.)	Larne

== Semi-finals ==
Team 1	Score	Team 2
Coleraine	1–0	Cliftonville
Portadown	3–1	Linfield

== Final ==
25 September 1985

Coleraine	5–0 (a.e.t.)	Portadown
Richardson 97'; Healy 105', 108', 111', 120'

Windsor Park, Belfast
Referee: Alan Snoddy (Lisburn)
