= 1959–60 Ulster Cup =

Tournament details
- Country: Northern Ireland
- Teams: 12

Final positions
- Champions: Linfield (2nd win)
- Runners-up: Crusaders

Tournament statistics
- Matches played: 32
- Goals scored: 128 (4 per match)

The 1959–60 Ulster Cup was the 12th edition of the Ulster Cup, a cup competition in Northern Irish football.

Linfield won the tournament for the 4th time, defeating Crusaders 4–1 in the final replay after the original final ended in a 1–1 draw.

== Group standings ==
=== Section A ===
Pos	Team	Pld	W	D	L	GF	GA	GR	Pts	Result
1	Linfield	5	5	0	0	17	4	4.250	10	Advance to final
2	Glenavon	5	4	0	1	23	6	3.833	8	
3	Portadown	5	2	0	3	12	13	0.923	4	
4	Ards	5	2	0	3	6	11	0.545	4	
5	Bangor	5	2	0	3	8	16	0.500	4	
6	Distillery	5	0	0	5	4	20	0.200	0	

Source: Irish League Archive

=== Section B ===
Pos	Team	Pld	W	D	L	GF	GA	GR	Pts	Result
1	Crusaders	5	4	0	1	13	3	4.333	8	Advance to final
2	Ballymena United	5	3	1	1	10	7	1.429	7	
3	Derry City	5	3	0	2	7	7	1.000	6	
4	Glentoran	5	2	1	2	9	9	1.000	5	
5	Coleraine	5	1	0	4	7	12	0.583	2	
6	Cliftonville	5	1	0	4	5	13	0.385	2	

Source: Irish League Archive

== Final ==
15 September 1959

Linfield	1–1	Crusaders
Milburn 8'	Report	Quee 89'

Solitude, Belfast
Attendance: 15,000
Referee: S. Cummings (Belfast)

=== Replay ===
5 October 1959

Linfield	4–1	Crusaders
Milburn 11', 17'; Ervine 34'; Stewart 89'	Report	Weatherup 5'

Windsor Park, Belfast
Referee: S. Carswell (Belfast)
