= 1993–94 Ulster Cup =

Tournament details
- Country: Northern Ireland
- Teams: 16

Final positions
- Champions: Crusaders (3rd win)
- Runners-up: Bangor

Tournament statistics
- Matches played: 31
- Goals scored: 85 (2.74 per match)

The 1993–94 Ulster Cup was the 46th edition of the Ulster Cup, a cup competition in Northern Irish football.

Crusaders won the tournament for the 3rd time, defeating Bangor 1–0 in the final.

== Group standings ==
=== Section A ===
| Pos | Team | Pld | W | D | L | GF | GA | GD | Pts | Result |
|---|---|---|---|---|---|---|---|---|---|---|
| 1 | Linfield | 3 | 1 | 2 | 0 | 6 | 3 | +3 | 5 | Advance to quarter-final |
| 2 | Larne | 3 | 1 | 1 | 1 | 4 | 4 | 0 | 4 | Advance to quarter-final |
| 3 | Distillery | 3 | 1 | 1 | 1 | 5 | 6 | −1 | 4 | |
| 4 | Carrick Rangers | 3 | 1 | 0 | 2 | 5 | 7 | −2 | 3 | |

Source: Irish League Archive

=== Section B ===
| Pos | Team | Pld | W | D | L | GF | GA | GD | Pts | Result |
|---|---|---|---|---|---|---|---|---|---|---|
| 1 | Crusaders | 3 | 2 | 1 | 0 | 6 | 3 | +3 | 7 | Advance to quarter-final |
| 2 | Ballymena United | 3 | 1 | 1 | 1 | 3 | 4 | −1 | 4 | Advance to quarter-final |
| 3 | Glenavon | 3 | 1 | 0 | 2 | 5 | 6 | −1 | 3 | |
| 4 | Newry Town | 3 | 1 | 0 | 2 | 3 | 4 | −1 | 3 | |

Source: Irish League Archive

=== Section C ===
| Pos | Team | Pld | W | D | L | GF | GA | GD | Pts | Result |
|---|---|---|---|---|---|---|---|---|---|---|
| 1 | Bangor | 3 | 3 | 0 | 0 | 6 | 0 | +6 | 9 | Advance to quarter-final |
| 2 | Glentoran | 3 | 1 | 1 | 1 | 3 | 3 | 0 | 4 | Advance to quarter-final |
| 3 | Cliftonville | 3 | 1 | 1 | 1 | 2 | 5 | −3 | 4 | |
| 4 | Coleraine | 3 | 0 | 0 | 3 | 3 | 6 | −3 | 0 | |

Source: Irish League Archive

=== Section D ===
| Pos | Team | Pld | W | D | L | GF | GA | GD | Pts | Result |
|---|---|---|---|---|---|---|---|---|---|---|
| 1 | Portadown | 3 | 3 | 0 | 0 | 13 | 0 | +13 | 9 | Advance to quarter-final |
| 2 | Ballyclare Comrades | 3 | 2 | 0 | 1 | 3 | 5 | −2 | 6 | Advance to quarter-final |
| 3 | Ards | 3 | 1 | 0 | 2 | 4 | 5 | −1 | 3 | |
| 4 | Omagh Town | 3 | 0 | 0 | 3 | 0 | 10 | −10 | 0 | |

Source: Irish League Archive

== Quarter-finals ==
| Team 1 | Score | Team 2 |
|---|---|---|
| Bangor | 2–0 | Ballyclare Comrades |
| Crusaders | 3–0 | Larne |
| Linfield | 1–0 | Ballymena United |
| Portadown | 3–0 | Glentoran |

== Semi-finals ==
| Team 1 | Score | Team 2 |
|---|---|---|
| Bangor | 2–1 | Linfield |
| Crusaders | 1–0 | Portadown |

== Final ==
19 October 1993

| Crusaders | 1–0 | Bangor |
|---|---|---|
| G. Hunter 30' |

Windsor Park, Belfast
Referee: N Cowie (Carryduff)
