= 1980–81 Ulster Cup =

Tournament details
- Country: Northern Ireland
- Teams: 12

Final positions
- Champions: Ballymena United (3rd win)
- Runners-up: Linfield

Tournament statistics
- Matches played: 66
- Goals scored: 219 (3.32 per match)

The 1980–81 Ulster Cup was the 33rd edition of the Ulster Cup, a cup competition in Northern Irish football.

Ballymena United won the tournament for the 3rd time, finishing top of the group standings.

== Group standings ==
Pos	Team	Pld	W	D	L	GF	GA	GD	Pts	Result
1	Ballymena United (C)	11	8	2	1	35	11	+24	18	Champions
2	Linfield	11	6	4	1	28	9	+19	16	
3	Glentoran	11	6	4	1	20	10	+10	16	
4	Glenavon	11	5	2	4	16	22	−6	12	
5	Coleraine	11	3	5	3	20	21	−1	11	
6	Larne	11	4	3	4	11	16	−5	11	
7	Portadown	11	4	2	5	21	17	+4	10	
8	Bangor	11	3	4	4	19	25	−6	10	
9	Cliftonville	11	2	5	4	17	20	−3	9	
10	Crusaders	11	2	3	6	12	23	−11	7	
11	Distillery	11	2	3	6	10	22	−12	7	
12	Ards	11	1	3	7	10	23	−13	5	

Source: Irish League Archive
(C) Champions
