= 1987–88 Ulster Cup =

Tournament details
- Country: Northern Ireland
- Teams: 16

Final positions
- Champions: Larne (2nd win)
- Runners-up: Coleraine

Tournament statistics
- Matches played: 31
- Goals scored: 88 (2.84 per match)

The 1987–88 Ulster Cup was the 40th edition of the Ulster Cup, a cup competition in Northern Irish football.

Larne won the tournament for the 2nd time, defeating Coleraine 2–1 in the final.

== Group standings ==
=== Section A ===
Pos	Team	Pld	W	D	L	GF	GA	GD	Pts	Result
1	Newry Town	3	2	1	0	7	3	+4	7	Advance to quarter-final
2	Linfield	3	1	2	0	2	1	+1	5	Advance to quarter-final
3	Portadown	3	0	2	1	1	2	−1	2	
4	Glenavon	3	0	1	2	3	7	−4	1	

Source: Irish League Archive

=== Section B ===
Pos	Team	Pld	W	D	L	GF	GA	GD	Pts	Result
1	Coleraine	3	2	1	0	10	3	+7	7	Advance to quarter-final
2	Bangor	3	1	1	1	3	3	0	4	Advance to quarter-final
3	Distillery	3	1	1	1	3	5	−2	4	
4	Ballymena United	3	0	1	2	1	6	−5	1	

Source: Irish League Archive

=== Section C ===
Pos	Team	Pld	W	D	L	GF	GA	GD	Pts	Result
1	Glentoran	3	3	0	0	11	3	+8	9	Advance to quarter-final
2	Crusaders	3	1	1	1	3	3	0	4	Advance to quarter-final
3	Ards	3	1	0	2	4	7	−3	3	
4	RUC	3	0	1	2	5	10	−5	1	

Source: Irish League Archive

=== Section D ===
Pos	Team	Pld	W	D	L	GF	GA	GD	Pts	Result
1	Larne	3	2	1	0	5	2	+3	7	Advance to quarter-final
2	Carrick Rangers	3	1	1	1	2	3	−1	4	Advance to quarter-final
3	Dundela	3	0	3	0	2	2	0	3	
4	Cliftonville	3	0	1	2	1	3	−2	1	

Source: Irish League Archive

== Quarter-finals ==
Team 1	Score	Team 2
Coleraine	3–2	Linfield
Glentoran	4–0	Dundela
Larne	2–1	Crusaders
Newry Town	2–3	Bangor

== Semi-finals ==
Team 1	Score	Team 2
Coleraine	3–1	Glentoran
Larne	1–0	Bangor

== Final ==
22 September 1987

Larne	2–1	Coleraine
Hardy 11'; Quigley 33' (o.g.)		Wade 10'

The Oval, Belfast
Referee: Walter Clarke (Newtownards)
