= 1988–89 Ulster Cup =

Tournament details
- Country: Northern Ireland
- Teams: 16

Final positions
- Champions: Glentoran (8th win)
- Runners-up: Larne

Tournament statistics
- Matches played: 31
- Goals scored: 94 (3.03 per match)

The 1988–89 Ulster Cup was the 41st edition of the Ulster Cup, a cup competition in Northern Irish football.

Glentoran won the tournament for the 8th time, defeating Larne 5–2 in the final.

== Group standings ==
=== Section A ===
Pos	Team	Pld	W	D	L	GF	GA	GD	Pts	Result
1	Glentoran	3	2	1	0	7	1	+6	7	Advance to quarter-final
2	Larne	3	2	1	0	7	4	+3	7	Advance to quarter-final
3	Crusaders	3	1	0	2	2	5	−3	3	
4	Carrick Rangers	3	0	0	3	2	8	−6	0	

Source: Irish League Archive

=== Section B ===
Pos	Team	Pld	W	D	L	GF	GA	GD	Pts	Result
1	Glenavon	3	2	0	1	5	4	+1	6	Advance to quarter-final
2	Cliftonville	3	1	1	1	8	8	0	4	Advance to quarter-final
3	Distillery	3	1	1	1	5	6	−1	4	
4	Linfield	3	1	0	2	4	4	0	3	

Source: Irish League Archive

=== Section C ===
Pos	Team	Pld	W	D	L	GF	GA	GD	Pts	Result
1	Coleraine	3	3	0	0	10	3	+7	9	Advance to quarter-final
2	Ballyclare Comrades	3	1	1	1	1	4	−3	4	Advance to quarter-final
3	Ballymena United	3	1	0	2	4	6	−2	3	
4	Ards	3	0	1	2	4	6	−2	1	

Source: Irish League Archive

=== Section D ===
Pos	Team	Pld	W	D	L	GF	GA	GD	Pts	Result
1	Portadown	3	2	1	0	7	1	+6	7	Advance to quarter-final
2	Omagh Town	3	0	3	0	2	2	0	3	Advance to quarter-final
3	Bangor	3	0	2	1	1	4	−3	2	
4	Newry Town	3	0	2	1	2	5	−3	2	

Source: Irish League Archive

== Quarter-finals ==
Team 1	Score	Team 2
Coleraine	3–1	Omagh Town
Glenavon	1–2	Larne
Glentoran	3–0	Cliftonville
Portadown	1–0	Ballyclare Comrades

== Semi-finals ==
Team 1	Score	Team 2
Glentoran	2–0	Coleraine
Larne	2–1 (a.e.t.)	Portadown

== Final ==
28 September 1988

Glentoran	5–2	Larne
Manley 40', 74', 90'; Bowers 41'; Cleary 89' (pen.)		D. Smyth 45', 80'

Windsor Park, Belfast
Referee: Alan Snoddy (Carryduff)
