= 1974–75 Ulster Cup =

Tournament details
- Country: Northern Ireland
- Teams: 12

Final positions
- Champions: Linfield (10th win)
- Runners-up: Glentoran

Tournament statistics
- Matches played: 66
- Goals scored: 208 (3.15 per match)

The 1974–75 Ulster Cup was the 27th edition of the Ulster Cup, a cup competition in Northern Irish football.

Linfield won the tournament for the 10th time, finishing top of the group standings.

== Group standings ==
Pos	Team	Pld	W	D	L	GF	GA	GR	Pts	Result
1	Linfield (C)	11	8	2	1	28	12	2.333	18	Champions
2	Glentoran	11	6	4	1	16	10	1.600	16	
3	Coleraine	11	5	3	3	23	14	1.643	13	
4	Bangor	11	5	2	4	20	15	1.333	12	
5	Portadown	11	5	2	4	16	18	0.889	12	
6	Glenavon	11	4	3	4	24	19	1.263	11	
7	Ballymena United	11	4	2	5	16	14	1.143	10	
8	Ards	11	4	2	5	17	22	0.773	10	
9	Larne	11	3	4	4	17	24	0.708	10	
10	Crusaders	11	3	3	5	14	15	0.933	9	
11	Distillery	11	3	3	5	10	16	0.625	9	
12	Cliftonville	11	0	2	9	7	29	0.241	2	

Source: Irish League Archive
(C) Champions
