= 1981–82 Ulster Cup =

Tournament details
- Country: Northern Ireland
- Teams: 12

Final positions
- Champions: Glentoran (5th win)
- Runners-up: Coleraine

Tournament statistics
- Matches played: 66
- Goals scored: 208 (3.15 per match)

The 1981–82 Ulster Cup was the 34th edition of the Ulster Cup, a cup competition in Northern Irish football.

Glentoran won the tournament for the 5th time, finishing top of the group standings.

== Group standings ==
Pos	Team	Pld	W	D	L	GF	GA	GD	Pts	Result
1	Glentoran (C)	11	8	3	0	28	9	+19	19	Champions
2	Coleraine	11	7	3	1	25	15	+10	17	
3	Cliftonville	11	6	4	1	20	11	+9	16	
4	Portadown	11	6	2	3	19	11	+8	14	
5	Glenavon	11	5	3	3	22	20	+2	13	
6	Linfield	11	4	4	3	18	18	0	12	
7	Crusaders	11	4	2	5	16	14	+2	10	
8	Ards	11	3	3	5	18	21	−3	9	
9	Ballymena United	11	3	1	7	12	19	−7	7	
10	Larne	11	3	1	7	10	21	−11	7	
11	Distillery	11	2	1	8	12	28	−16	5	
12	Bangor	11	1	1	9	8	21	−13	3	

Source: Irish League Archive
(C) Champions
