= 1977–78 Ulster Cup =

Tournament details
- Country: Northern Ireland
- Teams: 12

Final positions
- Champions: Linfield (11th win)
- Runners-up: Coleraine

Tournament statistics
- Matches played: 66
- Goals scored: 199 (3.02 per match)

The 1977–78 Ulster Cup was the 30th edition of the Ulster Cup, a cup competition in Northern Irish football.

Linfield won the tournament for the 11th time, finishing top of the group standings.

== Group standings ==
Pos	Team	Pld	W	D	L	GF	GA	GD	Pts	Result
1	Linfield (C)	11	8	2	1	24	9	+15	18	Champions
2	Coleraine	11	7	3	1	21	12	+9	17	
3	Larne	11	7	2	2	18	9	+9	16	
4	Portadown	11	6	1	4	26	16	+10	13	
5	Glentoran	11	6	1	4	24	17	+7	13	
6	Crusaders	11	6	0	5	15	13	+2	12	
7	Ards	11	4	3	4	14	16	−2	11	
8	Ballymena United	11	4	3	4	15	20	−5	11	
9	Distillery	11	4	0	7	12	19	−7	8	
10	Cliftonville	11	2	3	6	10	15	−5	7	
11	Glenavon	11	2	2	7	12	21	−9	6	
12	Bangor	11	0	0	11	8	32	−24	0	

Source: Irish League Archive
(C) Champions
