= 1997–98 Ulster Cup =

Tournament details
- Country: Northern Ireland
- Teams: 8

Final positions
- Champions: Ballyclare Comrades (1st win)
- Runners-up: Distillery

Tournament statistics
- Matches played: 28
- Goals scored: 81 (2.89 per match)

The 1997–98 Ulster Cup was the 50th edition of the Ulster Cup, a cup competition in Northern Irish football. This edition featured only clubs from the First Division.

Ballyclare Comrades won the tournament for the 1st time, finishing top of the group standings.

== Group standings ==
Pos	Team	Pld	W	D	L	GF	GA	GD	Pts	Result
1	Ballyclare Comrades (C)	7	6	1	0	16	4	+12	19	Champions
2	Distillery	7	4	1	2	13	8	+5	13	
3	Bangor	7	3	2	2	11	8	+3	11	
4	Newry Town	7	3	2	2	10	8	+2	11	
5	Carrick Rangers	7	2	3	2	8	9	−1	9	
6	Larne	7	1	3	3	7	16	−9	6	
7	Limavady United	7	1	2	4	6	13	−7	5	
8	Dungannon Swifts	7	1	0	6	10	15	−5	3	

Source: Irish League Archive
(C) Champions
