= 1963–64 Ulster Cup =

Tournament details
- Country: Northern Ireland
- Teams: 12

Final positions
- Champions: Crusaders (2nd win)
- Runners-up: Glenavon

Tournament statistics
- Matches played: 32
- Goals scored: 159 (4.97 per match)

The 1963–64 Ulster Cup was the 16th edition of the Ulster Cup, a cup competition in Northern Irish football.

Crusaders won the tournament for the 2nd time, defeating Glenavon 1–0 in the final replay, after the original final finished in a 2–2 draw.

== Group standings ==
=== Section A ===
Pos	Team	Pld	W	D	L	GF	GA	GR	Pts	Result
1	Glenavon	5	4	1	0	21	6	3.500	9	Advance to final
2	Portadown	5	2	2	1	15	10	1.500	6	
3	Distillery	5	2	1	2	13	10	1.300	5	
4	Glentoran	5	2	1	2	10	12	0.833	5	
5	Ards	5	1	1	3	11	18	0.611	3	
6	Bangor	5	1	0	4	7	21	0.333	2	

Source: Irish League Archive

=== Section B ===
Pos	Team	Pld	W	D	L	GF	GA	GR	Pts	Result
1	Crusaders	5	4	1	0	21	4	5.250	9	Advance to final
2	Linfield	5	3	1	1	16	11	1.455	7	
3	Coleraine	5	3	1	1	9	8	1.125	7	
4	Derry City	5	1	2	2	14	12	1.167	4	
5	Ballymena United	5	1	1	3	11	21	0.524	3	
6	Cliftonville	5	0	0	5	6	21	0.286	0	

Source: Irish League Archive

== Final ==
17 September 1963

Crusaders	2–2	Glenavon
Hale 39', 83'	Report	Campbell 64'; Wilson 66'

Windsor Park, Belfast
Referee: Arthur Holland (Barnsley)

=== Replay ===
1 October 1963

Crusaders	1–0	Glenavon
McNeill	Report

Windsor Park, Belfast
