= 1966–67 Ulster Cup =

Tournament details
- Country: Northern Ireland
- Teams: 12

Final positions
- Champions: Glentoran (3rd win)
- Runners-up: Glenavon

Tournament statistics
- Matches played: 66
- Goals scored: 289 (4.38 per match)

The 1966–67 Ulster Cup was the 19th edition of the Ulster Cup, a cup competition in Northern Irish football.

Glentoran won the tournament for the 3rd time, finishing top of the group standings.

== Group standings ==
Pos	Team	Pld	W	D	L	GF	GA	GR	Pts	Result
1	Glentoran (C)	11	10	1	0	31	8	3.875	21	Champions
2	Glenavon	11	7	1	3	29	14	2.071	15	
3	Coleraine	11	7	0	4	22	18	1.222	14	
4	Crusaders	11	6	1	4	37	23	1.609	13	
5	Ballymena United	11	5	3	3	28	24	1.167	13	
6	Ards	11	5	2	4	30	16	1.875	12	
7	Linfield	11	6	0	5	27	20	1.350	12	
8	Derry City	11	5	2	4	29	23	1.261	12	
9	Portadown	11	3	3	5	18	22	0.818	9	
10	Distillery	11	4	1	6	19	36	0.528	9	
11	Bangor	11	1	0	10	10	41	0.244	2	
12	Cliftonville	11	0	0	11	9	44	0.205	0	

Source: Irish League Archive
(C) Champions
