= 1952–53 Ulster Cup =

Tournament details
- Country: Northern Ireland
- Teams: 12

Final positions
- Champions: Glentoran (2nd win)
- Runners-up: Distillery

Tournament statistics
- Matches played: 61
- Goals scored: 229 (3.75 per match)

The 1952–53 Ulster Cup was the fifth edition of the Ulster Cup, a cup competition in Northern Irish football.

Glentoran won the tournament for the 2nd time, defeating Distillery 3–0 in the final.

== Group standings ==
=== Section A ===
Pos	Team	Pld	W	D	L	GF	GA	GR	Pts	Result
1	Distillery	10	6	3	1	17	8	2.125	15	Advance to final
2	Glenavon	10	6	2	2	19	10	1.900	14	
3	Ards	10	3	3	4	13	15	0.867	9	
4	Portadown	10	3	3	4	11	16	0.688	9	
5	Linfield	10	3	2	5	14	13	1.077	8	
6	Bangor	10	2	1	7	11	23	0.478	5	

Source: Irish League Archive

=== Section B ===
Pos	Team	Pld	W	D	L	GF	GA	GR	Pts	Result
1	Glentoran	10	8	0	2	40	19	2.105	16	Advance to final
2	Coleraine	10	7	1	2	27	15	1.800	15	
3	Crusaders	10	4	2	4	19	26	0.731	10	
4	Ballymena United	10	4	1	5	23	24	0.958	9	
5	Cliftonville	10	2	2	6	21	30	0.700	6	
6	Derry City	10	1	2	7	11	27	0.407	4	

Source: Irish League Archive

== Final ==
30 September 1952

Glentoran	3–0	Distillery
McCarthy; Deakin; Lowry	Report

Solitude, Belfast
