= 1948–49 Ulster Cup =

Tournament details
- Country: Northern Ireland
- Teams: 8

Final positions
- Champions: Linfield (1st win)
- Runners-up: Ards

Tournament statistics
- Matches played: 13
- Goals scored: 57 (4.38 per match)

The 1948–49 Ulster Cup was the inaugural edition of the Ulster Cup, a cup competition in Northern Irish football.

Linfield won the tournament for the 1st time, defeating Ards 3–0 in the final.

== Group stage ==
=== Section A ===
Pos	Team	Pld	W	D	L	GF	GA	GR	Pts	Result
1	Linfield	3	3	0	0	9	1	9.000	6	Advance to final
2	Crusaders	3	1	1	1	5	5	1.000	3	
3	Glenavon	3	1	0	2	7	5	1.400	2	
4	Portadown	3	0	1	2	3	13	0.231	1	

Source: Irish League Archive

=== Section B ===
Pos	Team	Pld	W	D	L	GF	GA	GR	Pts	Result
1	Ards	3	3	0	0	12	5	2.400	6	Advance to final
2	Coleraine	3	1	1	1	6	7	0.857	3	
3	Bangor	3	0	2	1	5	7	0.714	2	
4	Dundela	3	0	1	2	7	11	0.636	1	

Source: Irish League Archive

== Final ==
19 May 1949

Linfield	3–0	Ards
Simpson	Report

Solitude, Belfast
