= 1958–59 Ulster Cup =

Tournament details
- Country: Northern Ireland
- Teams: 12

Final positions
- Champions: Glenavon (2nd win)
- Runners-up: Crusaders

Tournament statistics
- Matches played: 31
- Goals scored: 131 (4.23 per match)

The 1958–59 Ulster Cup was the 11th edition of the Ulster Cup, a cup competition in Northern Irish football.

Glenavon won the tournament for the 2nd time, defeating Crusaders 2–0 in the final.

== Group standings ==
=== Section A ===
Pos	Team	Pld	W	D	L	GF	GA	GR	Pts	Result
1	Glenavon	5	4	0	1	13	6	2.167	8	Advance to final
2	Ards	5	3	1	1	10	9	1.111	7	
3	Linfield	5	3	0	2	16	10	1.600	6	
4	Portadown	5	2	1	2	11	11	1.000	5	
5	Distillery	5	1	0	4	7	11	0.636	2	
6	Bangor	5	1	0	4	5	15	0.333	2	

Source: Irish League Archive

=== Section B ===
Pos	Team	Pld	W	D	L	GF	GA	GR	Pts	Result
1	Crusaders	5	4	1	0	16	10	1.600	9	Advance to final
2	Ballymena United	5	3	0	2	16	14	1.143	6	
3	Glentoran	5	1	2	2	10	10	1.000	4	
4	Cliftonville	5	2	0	3	8	9	0.889	4	
5	Derry City	5	1	2	2	7	12	0.583	4	
6	Coleraine	5	1	1	3	10	12	0.833	3	

Source: Irish League Archive

== Final ==
24 September 1958

Glenavon	2–0	Crusaders
Campbell; Denver	Report

Windsor Park, Belfast
