= 1956–57 Ulster Cup =

Tournament details
- Country: Northern Ireland
- Teams: 12

Final positions
- Champions: Linfield (3rd win)
- Runners-up: Distillery

Tournament statistics
- Matches played: 66
- Goals scored: 284 (4.3 per match)

The 1956–57 Ulster Cup was the ninth edition of the Ulster Cup, a cup competition in Northern Irish football.

Linfield won the tournament for the 3rd time, finishing top of the group standings.

== Group standings ==
Pos	Team	Pld	W	D	L	GF	GA	GR	Pts	Result
1	Linfield (C)	11	9	2	0	35	15	2.333	20	Champions
2	Distillery	11	7	2	2	26	15	1.733	16	
3	Bangor	11	6	1	4	32	28	1.143	13	
4	Ards	11	5	2	4	21	22	0.955	12	
5	Ballymena United	11	5	2	4	20	21	0.952	12	
6	Portadown	11	5	1	5	21	17	1.235	11	
7	Glentoran	11	5	1	5	25	24	1.042	11	
8	Glenavon	11	4	2	5	25	21	1.190	10	
9	Derry City	11	4	1	6	27	29	0.931	9	
10	Crusaders	11	3	1	7	17	30	0.567	7	
11	Coleraine	11	3	0	8	22	39	0.564	6	
12	Cliftonville	11	2	1	8	13	23	0.565	5	

Source: Irish League Archive
(C) Champions
