= 1960–61 Ulster Cup =

Tournament details
- Country: Northern Ireland
- Teams: 12

Final positions
- Champions: Ballymena United (2nd win)
- Runners-up: Glenavon

Tournament statistics
- Matches played: 31
- Goals scored: 140 (4.52 per match)

The 1960–61 Ulster Cup was the 13th edition of the Ulster Cup, a cup competition in Northern Irish football.

Ballymena United won the tournament for the 2nd time, defeating Glenavon 3–1 in the final.

== Group standings ==
=== Section A ===
Pos	Team	Pld	W	D	L	GF	GA	GR	Pts	Result
1	Glenavon	5	4	1	0	15	5	3.000	9	Advance to final
2	Linfield	5	4	0	1	19	9	2.111	8	
3	Ards	5	3	1	1	13	10	1.300	7	
4	Portadown	5	2	0	3	4	7	0.571	4	
5	Distillery	5	1	0	4	13	18	0.722	2	
6	Bangor	5	0	0	5	4	19	0.211	0	

Source: Irish League Archive

=== Section B ===
Pos	Team	Pld	W	D	L	GF	GA	GR	Pts	Result
1	Ballymena United	5	4	1	0	13	2	6.500	9	Advance to final
2	Derry City	5	3	1	1	12	10	1.200	7	
3	Glentoran	5	2	1	2	12	9	1.333	5	
4	Coleraine	5	2	1	2	13	12	1.083	5	
5	Crusaders	5	2	0	3	11	13	0.846	4	
6	Cliftonville	5	0	0	5	7	22	0.318	0	

Source: Irish League Archive

== Final ==
7 October 1960

Ballymena United	3–1	Glenavon
Barr 28', 75'; McKinstry 57' (o.g.)		Jones 89'

Grosvenor Park, Belfast
