= 1951–52 Festival of Britain Cup =

Tournament details
- Country: Northern Ireland
- Teams: 12

Final positions
- Champions: Ballymena United (1st win)
- Runners-up: Crusaders

Tournament statistics
- Matches played: 28
- Goals scored: 109 (3.89 per match)

The 1951–52 Festival of Britain Cup was the fourth edition of the Ulster Cup, a cup competition in Northern Irish football. The tournament was renamed from the Ulster Cup for one season only as part of the Festival of Britain celebrations that were held that year.

Ballymena United won the tournament for the 1st time, defeating Crusaders 3–0 in the final.

== Group stage ==
=== Section A ===
Pos	Team	Pld	W	D	L	GF	GA	GR	Pts	Result
1	Glentoran	4	3	0	1	11	7	1.571	6	Advance to semi-final
2	Ards	4	2	0	2	7	5	1.400	4	
3	Bangor	4	1	0	3	5	11	0.455	2	

Source: Irish League Archive

=== Section B ===
Pos	Team	Pld	W	D	L	GF	GA	GR	Pts	Result
1	Ballymena United	4	3	0	1	14	10	1.400	6	Advance to semi-final
2	Coleraine	4	3	0	1	13	6	2.167	6	
3	Derry City	4	0	0	4	2	13	0.154	0	

Source: Irish League Archive

==== Playoff ====
- Ballymena United 3–2 Coleraine

=== Section C ===
Pos	Team	Pld	W	D	L	GF	GA	GR	Pts	Result
1	Glenavon	4	3	1	0	12	2	6.000	7	Advance to semi-final
2	Linfield	4	1	1	2	2	4	0.500	3	
3	Portadown	4	1	0	3	4	12	0.333	2	

Source: Irish League Archive

=== Section D ===
Pos	Team	Pld	W	D	L	GF	GA	GR	Pts	Result
1	Crusaders	4	3	0	1	12	8	1.500	6	Advance to semi-final
2	Cliftonville	4	2	0	2	9	9	1.000	4	
3	Distillery	4	1	0	3	6	10	0.600	2	

Source: Irish League Archive

== Semi-finals ==
Team 1	Score	Team 2
Ballymena United	1–0	Glentoran
Crusaders	1–2^{1}	Glenavon

^{1}Glenavon were dismissed from the competition for fielding an ineligible player. Crusaders progressed to the final.

== Final ==
17 May 1952

Ballymena United	3–0	Crusaders
Lyness; Walsh	Report

Solitude, Belfast
Referee: H. Collinge (Sale)
