= 1971–72 Ulster Cup =

Tournament details
- Country: Northern Ireland
- Teams: 12

Final positions
- Champions: Linfield (9th win)
- Runners-up: Ballymena United

Tournament statistics
- Matches played: 66
- Goals scored: 222 (3.36 per match)

The 1971–72 Ulster Cup was the 24th edition of the Ulster Cup, a cup competition in Northern Irish football.

Linfield won the tournament for the 9th time and 2nd consecutive season, finishing top of the group standings.

== Group standings ==
Pos	Team	Pld	W	D	L	GF	GA	GR	Pts	Result
1	Linfield (C)	11	9	0	2	25	11	2.273	18	Champions
2	Ballymena United	11	7	1	3	18	16	1.125	15	
3	Portadown	11	6	1	4	26	16	1.625	13	
4	Glentoran	11	5	2	4	17	13	1.308	12	
5	Coleraine	11	5	2	4	24	22	1.091	12	
6	Bangor	11	4	3	4	14	13	1.077	11	
7	Distillery	11	4	3	4	13	14	0.929	11	
8	Derry City	11	5	0	6	21	20	1.050	10	
9	Ards	11	5	0	6	16	20	0.800	10	
10	Crusaders	11	3	2	6	20	26	0.769	8	
11	Glenavon	11	4	0	7	15	28	0.536	8	
12	Cliftonville	11	1	2	8	13	23	0.565	4	

Source: Irish League Archive
(C) Champions
