= 2023–24 County Antrim Shield =

Tournament details
- Country: Northern Ireland
- Teams: 16

Final positions
- Champions: Larne (4th title)
- Runners-up: Glentoran

Tournament statistics
- Matches played: 15
- Goals scored: 35 (2.33 per match)

The 2023–24 County Antrim Shield was the 135th edition of the County Antrim Shield, a cup competition in Northern Irish football.

Larne won the tournament for the 4th time and 4th consecutive season, defeating Glentoran 2–1 in the final.

== Results ==
=== First round ===
Team 1	Score	Team 2
Ards	2–1	Queen's University
Ballymena United	3–4	Knockbreda
Bangor	4–2	Ballyclare Comrades
Carrick Rangers	3–2	Cliftonville
Crusaders	0–0 (2–4 p)	Glentoran
Dundela	3–0	Newington
Harland & Wolff Welders	1–1 (7–8 p)	Ballymacash Rangers
Linfield	0–1	Larne

=== Quarter-finals ===
Team 1	Score	Team 2
Ards	0–2	Glentoran
Ballymacash Rangers	3–3 (6–7 p)	Knockbreda
Carrick Rangers	3–1	Dundela
Larne	3–0	Bangor

=== Semi-finals ===
Team 1	Score	Team 2
Carrick Rangers	0–4	Glentoran
Larne	4–0	Ballymacash Rangers

=== Final ===
23 January 2024

Larne	2–1	Glentoran
Bolger 39'; Cosgrove 58'	Report	Fisher 48'

Seaview, Belfast

== Notes ==
1. Knockbreda were dismissed from the competition for playing an ineligible player in their match with Ballymacash.
