= 1968–69 Ulster Cup =

Tournament details
- Country: Northern Ireland
- Teams: 12

Final positions
- Champions: Coleraine (2nd win)
- Runners-up: Linfield

Tournament statistics
- Matches played: 66
- Goals scored: 263 (3.98 per match)

The 1968–69 Ulster Cup was the 21st edition of the Ulster Cup, a cup competition in Northern Irish football.

Coleraine won the tournament for the 2nd time, finishing top of the group standings.

== Group standings ==
Pos	Team	Pld	W	D	L	GF	GA	GR	Pts	Result
1	Coleraine (C)	11	10	0	1	38	11	3.455	20	Champions
2	Linfield	11	7	4	0	27	14	1.929	18	
3	Glentoran	11	6	1	4	26	13	2.000	13	
4	Bangor	11	5	3	3	21	18	1.167	13	
5	Ards	11	4	4	3	24	19	1.263	12	
6	Derry City	11	5	2	4	23	20	1.150	12	
7	Crusaders	11	5	2	4	28	27	1.037	12	
8	Distillery	11	5	2	4	22	22	1.000	12	
9	Glenavon	11	3	3	5	15	17	0.882	9	
10	Ballymena United	11	1	2	8	15	30	0.500	4	
11	Cliftonville	11	1	2	8	13	29	0.448	4	
12	Portadown	11	0	3	8	11	43	0.256	3	

Source: Irish League Archive
(C) Champions
