= 1970–71 Ulster Cup =

Tournament details
- Country: Northern Ireland
- Teams: 12

Final positions
- Champions: Linfield (8th win)
- Runners-up: Coleraine

Tournament statistics
- Matches played: 66
- Goals scored: 215 (3.26 per match)

The 1970–71 Ulster Cup was the 23rd edition of the Ulster Cup, a cup competition in Northern Irish football.

Linfield won the tournament for the 8th time, finishing top of the group standings.

== Group standings ==
Pos	Team	Pld	W	D	L	GF	GA	GR	Pts	Result
1	Linfield (C)	11	9	0	2	20	14	1.429	18	Champions
2	Coleraine	11	6	2	3	21	13	1.615	14	
3	Distillery	11	5	4	2	20	16	1.250	14	
4	Crusaders	11	5	2	4	15	12	1.250	12	
5	Ballymena United	11	4	4	3	19	17	1.118	12	
6	Portadown	11	5	2	4	19	20	0.950	12	
7	Glenavon	11	3	5	3	19	13	1.462	11	
8	Glentoran	11	4	2	5	20	15	1.333	10	
9	Ards	11	3	4	4	20	24	0.833	10	
10	Derry City	11	3	2	6	17	20	0.850	8	
11	Bangor	11	1	4	6	14	26	0.538	6	
12	Cliftonville	11	1	3	7	11	25	0.440	5	

Source: Irish League Archive
(C) Champions
