= 1964–65 Ulster Cup =

Tournament details
- Country: Northern Ireland
- Teams: 12

Final positions
- Champions: Linfield (6th win)
- Runners-up: Glentoran

Tournament statistics
- Matches played: 32
- Goals scored: 125 (3.91 per match)

The 1964–65 Ulster Cup was the 17th edition of the Ulster Cup, a cup competition in Northern Irish football.

Linfield won the tournament for the 6th time, defeating Glentoran 1–0 in the final.

== Group standings ==
=== Section A ===
| Pos | Team | Pld | W | D | L | GF | GA | GR | Pts | Result |
|---|---|---|---|---|---|---|---|---|---|---|
| 1 | Linfield | 5 | 5 | 0 | 0 | 12 | 4 | 3.000 | 10 | Advance to final |
| 2 | Distillery | 5 | 3 | 1 | 1 | 11 | 4 | 2.750 | 7 | |
| 3 | Glenavon | 5 | 2 | 2 | 1 | 8 | 6 | 1.333 | 6 | |
| 4 | Bangor | 5 | 1 | 1 | 3 | 9 | 13 | 0.692 | 3 | |
| 5 | Portadown | 5 | 1 | 1 | 3 | 4 | 10 | 0.400 | 3 | |
| 6 | Ards | 5 | 0 | 1 | 4 | 6 | 13 | 0.462 | 1 | |

Source: Irish League Archive

=== Section B ===
| Pos | Team | Pld | W | D | L | GF | GA | GR | Pts | Result |
|---|---|---|---|---|---|---|---|---|---|---|
| 1 | Glentoran | 5 | 4 | 1 | 0 | 14 | 6 | 2.333 | 9 | Advance to final |
| 2 | Derry City | 5 | 4 | 1 | 0 | 20 | 10 | 2.000 | 9 | |
| 3 | Coleraine | 5 | 2 | 1 | 2 | 12 | 8 | 1.500 | 5 | |
| 4 | Ballymena United | 5 | 2 | 0 | 3 | 12 | 14 | 0.857 | 4 | |
| 5 | Crusaders | 5 | 1 | 1 | 3 | 7 | 14 | 0.500 | 3 | |
| 6 | Cliftonville | 5 | 0 | 0 | 5 | 3 | 16 | 0.188 | 0 | |

Source: Irish League Archive

==== Playoff ====
- Glentoran 4–2 Derry City

== Final ==
2 December 1964

| Linfield | 1–0 | Glentoran |
|---|---|---|
| Scott 40' | Report |

Windsor Park, Belfast
Referee: Malcolm Wright (Portadown)
