= 1949–50 Ulster Cup =

Tournament details
- Country: Northern Ireland
- Teams: 16

Final positions
- Champions: Larne (1st win)
- Runners-up: Ballymena United

Tournament statistics
- Matches played: 27
- Goals scored: 99 (3.67 per match)

The 1949–50 Ulster Cup was the second edition of the Ulster Cup, a cup competition in Northern Irish football.

Larne won the tournament for the 1st time, defeating Ballymena United 2–1 in the final.

== Group stage ==
=== Section A ===
| Pos | Team | Pld | W | D | L | GF | GA | GR | Pts | Result |
|---|---|---|---|---|---|---|---|---|---|---|
| 1 | Larne | 3 | 2 | 0 | 1 | 6 | 3 | 2.000 | 4 | Advance to semi-final |
| 2 | Distillery | 3 | 2 | 0 | 1 | 4 | 3 | 1.333 | 4 | |
| 3 | Crusaders | 3 | 1 | 1 | 1 | 6 | 6 | 1.000 | 3 | |
| 4 | Cliftonville | 3 | 0 | 1 | 2 | 3 | 7 | 0.429 | 1 | |

Source: Irish League Archive

=== Section B ===
| Pos | Team | Pld | W | D | L | GF | GA | GR | Pts | Result |
|---|---|---|---|---|---|---|---|---|---|---|
| 1 | Glenavon | 3 | 3 | 0 | 0 | 10 | 2 | 5.000 | 6 | Advance to semi-final |
| 2 | Linfield | 3 | 1 | 0 | 2 | 6 | 6 | 1.000 | 2 | |
| 3 | Portadown | 3 | 1 | 0 | 2 | 4 | 6 | 0.667 | 2 | |
| 4 | Brantwood | 3 | 1 | 0 | 2 | 4 | 10 | 0.400 | 2 | |

Source: Irish League Archive

=== Section C ===
| Pos | Team | Pld | W | D | L | GF | GA | GR | Pts | Result |
|---|---|---|---|---|---|---|---|---|---|---|
| 1 | Glentoran | 3 | 3 | 0 | 0 | 6 | 1 | 6.000 | 6 | Advance to semi-final |
| 2 | Bangor | 3 | 2 | 0 | 1 | 7 | 4 | 1.750 | 4 | |
| 3 | Ards | 3 | 1 | 0 | 2 | 5 | 5 | 1.000 | 2 | |
| 4 | Dundela | 3 | 0 | 0 | 3 | 4 | 12 | 0.333 | 0 | |

Source: Irish League Archive

=== Section D ===
| Pos | Team | Pld | W | D | L | GF | GA | GR | Pts | Result |
|---|---|---|---|---|---|---|---|---|---|---|
| 1 | Ballymena United | 3 | 3 | 0 | 0 | 8 | 2 | 4.000 | 6 | Advance to semi-final |
| 2 | Coleraine | 3 | 1 | 0 | 2 | 5 | 6 | 0.833 | 2 | |
| 3 | Ulsterville | 3 | 1 | 0 | 2 | 6 | 8 | 0.750 | 2 | |
| 4 | Derry City | 3 | 1 | 0 | 2 | 6 | 9 | 0.667 | 2 | |

Source: Irish League Archive

== Semi-finals ==
| Team 1 | Score | Team 2 |
|---|---|---|
| Ballymena United | 2–1 | Glentoran |
| Larne | 3–0 | Glenavon |

== Final ==
27 April 1950

| Larne | 2–1 | Ballymena United |
|---|---|---|
| McIlreavy 19' (o.g.); McDonald 76' | Report | Douglas 28' (pen.) |

Grosvenor Park, Belfast
