= 1967–68 Ulster Cup =

Tournament details
- Country: Northern Ireland
- Teams: 12

Final positions
- Champions: Linfield (7th win)
- Runners-up: Glentoran

Tournament statistics
- Matches played: 67
- Goals scored: 255 (3.81 per match)

The 1967–68 Ulster Cup was the 20th edition of the Ulster Cup, a cup competition in Northern Irish football.

Linfield won the tournament for the 7th time, finishing top of the group standings.

== Group standings ==
Pos	Team	Pld	W	D	L	GF	GA	GR	Pts	Result
1	Linfield (C)	11	10	0	1	39	10	3.900	20	Champions
2	Glentoran	11	7	2	2	25	11	2.273	16	
3	Glenavon	11	7	2	2	20	14	1.429	16	
4	Derry City	11	6	2	3	26	18	1.444	14	
5	Bangor	11	5	4	2	26	19	1.368	14	
6	Ards	11	4	4	3	24	20	1.200	12	
7	Ballymena United	11	5	1	5	25	30	0.833	11	
8	Distillery	11	3	3	5	12	16	0.750	9	
9	Crusaders	11	1	5	5	22	32	0.688	7	
10	Coleraine	11	2	1	8	17	27	0.630	5	
11	Portadown	11	2	1	8	9	24	0.375	5	
12	Cliftonville	11	0	3	8	6	30	0.200	3	

Source: Irish League Archive
(C) Champions

=== Playoff ===
- Glentoran beat Glenavon 3–1 in a test match for second place.
