= Dennis Shiels =

Northern Irish footballer (1938–2026)

Personal information
- Full name: Dennis Patrick Shiels
- Date of birth: 24 August 1938
- Place of birth: Belfast, Northern Ireland
- Date of death: 2026 (aged 87)
- Height: 5 ft 8 in (1.73 m)
- Positions: Centre forward; outside right

Youth career
- Distillery

Senior career*
Years	Team	Apps	(Gls)
1958–1964	Sheffield United	32	(8)
1964–1965	Peterborough United	12	(4)
1965–1966	Notts County	28	(6)
1966–1967	Retford		
1967	Sligo Rovers	7	(2)

International career
1959–1960	Northern Ireland B	2	(0)
Medal record
Distillery
Winner	Ulster Cup	1958
Sheffield United
Runner-up	Second Division	1961
- * Club domestic league appearances and goals

Dennis Patrick Shiels (24 August 1938 – 2026) was a Northern Irish footballer who played as a centre forward or outside right. He began his career with Distillery before moving to England where he had spells with Sheffield United, Peterborough United, Notts County and Retford before returning to Ireland to finish his career with Sligo Rovers. Shiels made two appearances for the Northern Ireland B national team.

== Club career ==
Born in Belfast, Northern Ireland, Shiels began his career as a schoolboy with Distillery, with whom he won the Ulster Cup in 1958 and was selected to represent Northern Ireland at schoolboy international level. He moved to Sheffield United in October 1958, along with fellow Distillery player Harry Orr for a combined fee of £9,000.

Shiels spent six seasons with United but failed to ever really make the transition to the first team, spending most of his time playing in the reserves. The most successful period of his time at Bramall Lane came during the 1959–60 season when he made 18 first team appearances and won his two Northern Ireland B caps.

Both Shiels and Orr left the Blades to sign for Peterborough United in July 1964 for a combined fee of £5,000. After just one season Shiels was on the move again, this time to Notts County before moving on to non–league Retford in July 1966 and then back to Ireland to play for Sligo Rovers in February 1967.

== International career ==
Shiels was selected to play for the Northern Ireland B team in 1959 and duly made his debut in a 1–1 draw against France B on 11 November of that year. He made one more appearance for Northern Ireland B, appearing once more against France in a 5–0 defeat on 16 March 1960.

== Personal life and death ==
Shiels was the son of former Distillery player Paddy Shiels. He trained to be an accountant and his transfer to Sheffield United was made on the understanding that he would be able to continue his studies. During his full-time football career in England, he continued his education which began at St Malachy's College, Belfast 1952–57, gaining additional qualifications leading to B.ED.Phys. Ed., Sheffield Univ. and MSc Sports Psychology, Manchester.Met.Univ. As an UEFA A Coach he worked for The FA Coach Education Programme and setting up and developing College Football Academies in Manchester and Northamptonshire.

Shiels died in 2026, aged 87.

== Honours ==
Distillery

- Ulster Cup: 1958

Sheffield United

- Second Division runner-up: 1961
