= 1972–73 Ulster Cup =

Tournament details
- Country: Northern Ireland
- Teams: 12

Final positions
- Champions: Coleraine (4th win)
- Runners-up: Distillery

Tournament statistics
- Matches played: 63
- Goals scored: 229 (3.63 per match)

The 1972–73 Ulster Cup was the 25th edition of the Ulster Cup, a cup competition in Northern Irish football.

Coleraine won the tournament for the 4th time, finishing top of the group standings.

== Group standings ==
Pos	Team	Pld	W	D	L	GF	GA	GR	Pts	Result
1	Coleraine (C)	11	7	2	2	25	18	1.389	16	Champions
2	Distillery	11	6	3	2	19	10	1.900	15	
3	Crusaders	11	6	3	2	23	13	1.769	15	
4	Portadown	11	6	3	2	22	15	1.467	15	
5	Ballymena United	11	6	2	3	24	15	1.600	14	
6	Linfield	11	6	2	3	25	21	1.190	14	
7	Ards	11	6	0	5	28	21	1.333	12	
8	Bangor	11	4	4	3	14	14	1.000	12	
9	Glentoran	11	4	2	5	20	21	0.952	10	
10	Cliftonville	11	2	0	9	14	29	0.483	4	
11	Glenavon	11	1	1	9	9	31	0.290	3	
12	Derry City	11	1	0	10	6	21	0.286	2	

Source: Irish League Archive
(C) Champions
- Derry City's home matches against Bangor, Coleraine and Portadown were unplayed. They were prevented from playing at the Brandywell and refused to play elsewhere. Bangor, Coleraine and Portadown were each awarded victory for these matches.
