= 1969–70 Ulster Cup =

Tournament details
- Country: Northern Ireland
- Teams: 12

Final positions
- Champions: Coleraine (3rd win)
- Runners-up: Glentoran

Tournament statistics
- Matches played: 66
- Goals scored: 236 (3.58 per match)

The 1969–70 Ulster Cup was the 22nd edition of the Ulster Cup, a cup competition in Northern Irish football.

Coleraine won the tournament for the 3rd time and 2nd consecutive season, finishing top of the group standings.

== Group standings ==
Pos	Team	Pld	W	D	L	GF	GA	GR	Pts	Result
1	Coleraine (C)	11	10	1	0	33	8	4.125	21	Champions
2	Glentoran	11	8	2	1	32	10	3.200	18	
3	Linfield	11	8	1	2	26	10	2.600	17	
4	Ballymena United	11	5	1	5	22	14	1.571	11	
5	Derry City	11	5	1	5	20	15	1.333	11	
6	Bangor	11	4	3	4	15	24	0.625	11	
7	Distillery	11	3	3	5	23	33	0.697	9	
8	Ards	11	3	2	6	19	23	0.826	8	
9	Glenavon	11	2	4	5	16	24	0.667	8	
10	Portadown	11	3	2	6	12	20	0.600	8	
11	Crusaders	11	1	4	6	14	22	0.636	6	
12	Cliftonville	11	2	0	9	9	38	0.237	4	

Source: Irish League Archive
(C) Champions
