= 1962–63 Ulster Cup =

Tournament details
- Country: Northern Ireland
- Teams: 12

Final positions
- Champions: Glenavon (3rd win)
- Runners-up: Coleraine

Tournament statistics
- Matches played: 31
- Goals scored: 132 (4.26 per match)

The 1962–63 Ulster Cup was the 15th edition of the Ulster Cup, a cup competition in Northern Irish football.

Glenavon won the tournament for the 3rd time, defeating Coleraine 1–0 in the final.

== Group standings ==
=== Section A ===
Pos	Team	Pld	W	D	L	GF	GA	GR	Pts	Result
1	Glenavon	5	3	2	0	14	7	2.000	8	Advance to final
2	Portadown	5	2	2	1	12	7	1.714	6	
3	Distillery	5	3	0	2	15	17	0.882	6	
4	Linfield	5	1	3	1	14	8	1.750	5	
5	Ards	5	1	1	3	4	11	0.364	3	
6	Bangor	5	1	0	4	8	17	0.471	2	

Source: Irish League Archive

=== Section B ===
Pos	Team	Pld	W	D	L	GF	GA	GR	Pts	Result
1	Coleraine	5	3	2	0	17	4	4.250	8	Advance to final
2	Derry City	5	3	1	1	9	7	1.286	7	
3	Glentoran	5	3	1	1	14	12	1.167	7	
4	Ballymena United	5	1	2	2	8	12	0.667	4	
5	Crusaders	5	1	1	3	10	11	0.909	3	
6	Cliftonville	5	0	1	4	7	19	0.368	1	

Source: Irish League Archive

== Final ==
19 September 1962

Glenavon	1–0	Coleraine
Campbell 19'	Report

Windsor Park, Belfast
Attendance: 10,000
