= 1965–66 Ulster Cup =

Tournament details
- Country: Northern Ireland
- Teams: 12

Final positions
- Champions: Coleraine (1st win)
- Runners-up: Linfield

Tournament statistics
- Matches played: 66
- Goals scored: 261 (3.95 per match)

The 1965–66 Ulster Cup was the 18th edition of the Ulster Cup, a cup competition in Northern Irish football.

Coleraine won the tournament for the 1st time, finishing top of the group standings.

== Group standings ==
| Pos | Team | Pld | W | D | L | GF | GA | GR | Pts | Result |
|---|---|---|---|---|---|---|---|---|---|---|
| 1 | Coleraine (C) | 11 | 6 | 5 | 0 | 21 | 7 | 3.000 | 17 | Champions |
| 2 | Linfield | 11 | 7 | 2 | 2 | 28 | 15 | 1.867 | 16 | |
| 3 | Derry City | 11 | 7 | 1 | 3 | 30 | 14 | 2.143 | 15 | |
| 4 | Crusaders | 11 | 5 | 3 | 3 | 23 | 21 | 1.095 | 13 | |
| 5 | Glentoran | 11 | 6 | 1 | 4 | 20 | 19 | 1.053 | 13 | |
| 6 | Ballymena United | 11 | 5 | 2 | 4 | 29 | 23 | 1.261 | 12 | |
| 7 | Bangor | 11 | 4 | 3 | 4 | 22 | 20 | 1.100 | 11 | |
| 8 | Portadown | 11 | 5 | 1 | 5 | 23 | 26 | 0.885 | 11 | |
| 9 | Glenavon | 11 | 4 | 1 | 6 | 22 | 24 | 0.917 | 9 | |
| 10 | Distillery | 11 | 3 | 1 | 7 | 16 | 23 | 0.696 | 7 | |
| 11 | Ards | 11 | 3 | 1 | 7 | 17 | 27 | 0.630 | 7 | |
| 12 | Cliftonville | 11 | 0 | 1 | 10 | 10 | 42 | 0.238 | 1 | |

Source: Irish League Archive
(C) Champions
