= 1954–55 Ulster Cup =

Tournament details
- Country: Northern Ireland
- Teams: 12

Final positions
- Champions: Glenavon (1st win)
- Runners-up: Coleraine

Tournament statistics
- Matches played: 31
- Goals scored: 120 (3.87 per match)

The 1954–55 Ulster Cup was the seventh edition of the Ulster Cup, a cup competition in Northern Irish football.

Glenavon won the tournament for the 1st time, defeating Coleraine 3–1 in the final.

== Group standings ==
=== Section A ===
Pos	Team	Pld	W	D	L	GF	GA	GR	Pts	Result
1	Glenavon	5	4	0	1	14	7	2.000	8	Advance to final
2	Bangor	5	3	1	1	9	4	2.250	7	
3	Linfield	5	2	1	2	11	7	1.571	5	
4	Ards	5	2	1	2	6	6	1.000	5	
5	Distillery	5	2	1	2	7	7	1.000	5	
6	Portadown	5	0	0	5	0	16	0.000	0	

Source: Irish League Archive

=== Section B ===
Pos	Team	Pld	W	D	L	GF	GA	GR	Pts	Result
1	Coleraine	5	4	1	0	20	6	3.333	9	Advance to final
2	Crusaders	5	3	1	1	15	7	2.143	7	
3	Glentoran	5	3	0	2	13	9	1.444	6	
4	Derry City	5	3	0	2	12	11	1.091	6	
5	Ballymena United	5	1	0	4	6	12	0.500	2	
6	Cliftonville	5	0	0	5	3	24	0.125	0	

Source: Irish League Archive

== Final ==
28 September 1954

Glenavon	3–1	Coleraine
McVeigh; Jones; Campbell	Report	Waterstone

Windsor Park, Belfast
Referee: P. Morris (Belfast)
