= Robbie Brunton =

Irish footballer (1973–2020)

Robbie Brunton (5 September 1973 – 1 October 2020) was an Irish footballer who played as a left-back during the 1990s and 2000s.

== Career ==
Brunton joined the nursery club Belvedere at the age of 8 and played for them for nine years until he signed for Stoke City as an apprentice in 1991. He signed professional forms the following year but never made the breakthrough to the first team and returned to Ireland to sign for Sligo Rovers in 1994. He lost two FAI Cup semi-finals and a FAI League Cup during his time at Sligo all to Shelbourne, where he made 60 league appearances. In the 1994–95 season he was voted Sligo player of the year, was selected for the Bord Gais All Stars selection as well as being nominated for the PFAI Young Player of the Year award, finishing runner up to Billy Woods of Cork City.

When his contract expired at the end of the 1996–97 season, Robbie moved to Coleraine. Coleraine won their first seven league games but were pipped to the league title by Crusaders. They did win the Ulster Cup defeating Crusaders in a penalty shoot out with Brunton scoring in the shoot out and also scoring the shot which brought Crusaders level. After only one season there, he was on the move again - this time to then champions Derry City. Derry failed to regain their title in the next season with Brunton missing ten weeks with a serious knee injury, and with a new manager coming in, Brunton was surplus to requirements. He signed for Bohemians and made his league debut on 28 August 1998 against Finn Harps. He spent two seasons at Bohs winning a runners-up medal in the FAI Cup again losing to Shelbourne before he moved to Buckley Park and Kilkenny City. The tackling left back - he was sent off a total of 13 times - later played for Monaghan United Dundalk, Newry Town and Cliftonville.

== Personal life ==
He died on 1 October 2020 at the age of 47.
