= Ulster Cup =

- Organiser(s): Irish Football Association
- Founded: 1949 reestablished - 2026
- Abolished: 2003
- Region: Northern Ireland
- Most championships: Linfield (15 titles)

The Ulster Cup is an annual football competition held by the Irish Football League for senior clubs.

In 2026 the Northern Ireland Football League brought the trophy back, awarding it to the winners of the UEFA Europa Conference League Play-Off. Linfield were the first club to win the trophy in this new iteration.

== History ==
Beginning in 1949, it was held on fifty-one occasions until being suspended after the 1998/99 season and discontinued after a one-off re-appearance in 2002/03. The last three editions were only open to First Division sides. From the mid-1980s to the early-1990s the competition was known as the Lombard Ulster Cup due to a sponsorship deal with the Lombard & Ulster Bank. It had previously been sponsored by Morans.

== Format ==
The format of the Ulster Cup varied from season to season. It often employed a league format, with each club playing each other once and the winner declared as the team with the most points; and sometimes a group basis, with the winners decided by a play-off.

The format over the years was as follows:

Years	No. of seasons	Format
1948–49	1	group system plus final
1949–52	3	group system plus top-four knockout
1952–56	4	group system plus final
1956–57	1	league
1957–65	8	group system plus final
1965–83	18	league
1983–85	2	group system plus top-four knockout
1985–96	11	group system plus top-eight knockout
1996–97	1	knock-out
1997–99 and 2002–03	3	league (First Division clubs only)

== Finals results ==
Winners of the Ulster Cup by season.

Key:

	Scores level after 90 minutes. A replay was required.
(a.e.t.)	Scores level after 90 minutes. Winner was decided in extra time with no penalty shootout required.
pens.	Scores level after extra time. A penalty shootout was required to determine the winner.

Season	Winner (number of titles)	Score	Runner-up	Venue
1948–49	Linfield (1)	3 – 0	Ards	Solitude, Belfast
1949–50	Larne (1)	2 – 1	Ballymena United	Grosvenor Park, Belfast
1950–51	Glentoran (1)	2 – 1	Linfield	Grosvenor Park, Belfast
1951–52 (Note: The tournament was renamed the Festival of Britain Cup for 1951–52.)	Ballymena United (1)	3 – 0	Crusaders	Solitude, Belfast
1952–53	Glentoran (2)	3 – 0	Distillery	Solitude, Belfast
1953–54	Crusaders (1)	2 – 1	Linfield	Solitude, Belfast
1954–55	Glenavon (1)	3 – 1	Coleraine	Windsor Park, Belfast
1955–56	Linfield (2)	5 – 1	Coleraine	The Oval, Belfast
1956–57	Linfield (3)	League format	Distillery	—
1957–58	Distillery (1)	1 – 1	Glentoran	Solitude, Belfast
Replay	Distillery (1)	4 – 1	Glentoran	Windsor Park, Belfast
1958–59	Glenavon (2)	2 – 0	Crusaders	Windsor Park, Belfast
1959–60	Linfield (4)	1 – 1	Crusaders	Solitude, Belfast
Replay	Linfield (4)	4 – 1	Crusaders	Windsor Park, Belfast
1960–61	Ballymena United (2)	3 – 1	Glenavon	Grosvenor Park, Belfast
1961–62	Linfield (5)	2 – 0	Glentoran	Windsor Park, Belfast
1962–63	Glenavon (3)	1 – 0	Coleraine	Windsor Park, Belfast
1963–64	Crusaders (2)	2 – 2	Glenavon	Windsor Park, Belfast
Replay	Crusaders (2)	1 – 0	Glenavon	Windsor Park, Belfast
1964–65	Linfield (6)	1 – 0	Glentoran	Windsor Park, Belfast
1965–66	Coleraine (1)	League format	Linfield	—
1966–67	Glentoran (3)	League format	Glenavon	—
1967–68	Linfield (7)	League format	Glentoran	—
1968–69	Coleraine (2)	League format	Linfield	—
1969–70	Coleraine (3)	League format	Glentoran	—
1970–71	Linfield (8)	League format	Coleraine	—
1971–72	Linfield (9)	League format	Ballymena United	—
1972–73	Coleraine (4)	League format	Distillery	—
1973–74	Ards (1)	League format	Linfield	—
1974–75	Linfield (10)	League format	Glentoran	—
1975–76	Coleraine (5)	League format	Linfield	—
1976–77	Glentoran (4)	League format	Portadown	—
1977–78	Linfield (11)	League format	Coleraine	—
1978–79	Linfield (12)	League format	Crusaders	—
1979–80	Linfield (13)	League format	Cliftonville	—
1980–81	Ballymena United (3)	League format	Linfield	—
1981–82	Glentoran (5)	League format	Coleraine	—
1982–83	Glentoran (6)	League format	Linfield	—
1983–84	Glentoran (7)	5 – 2 (a.e.t.)	Coleraine	Windsor Park, Belfast
1984–85	Linfield (14)	2 – 2 (a.e.t.) (3 – 2 pens.)	Larne	The Oval, Belfast
1985–86	Coleraine (6)	5 – 0 (a.e.t.)	Portadown	Windsor Park, Belfast
1986–87	Coleraine (7)	1 – 0	Linfield	The Oval, Belfast
1987–88	Larne (2)	2 – 1	Coleraine	The Oval, Belfast
1988–89	Glentoran (8)	5 – 2	Larne	Windsor Park, Belfast
1989–90	Glentoran (9)	3 – 1	Glenavon	Windsor Park, Belfast
1990–91	Portadown (1)	1 – 1	Glenavon	The Oval, Belfast
Replay	Portadown (1)	1 – 1 (a.e.t.) (3 – 2 pens.)	Glenavon	The Oval, Belfast
1991–92	Bangor (1)	3 – 1	Crusaders	The Oval, Belfast
1992–93	Linfield (15)	2 – 0	Ards	The Oval, Belfast
1993–94	Crusaders (3)	1 – 0	Bangor	Windsor Park, Belfast
1994–95	Bangor (2)	2 – 1	Linfield	The Oval, Belfast
1995–96	Portadown (2)	2 – 2 (a.e.t.) (5 – 3 pens.)	Linfield	Windsor Park, Belfast
1996–97	Coleraine (8)	1 – 1 (a.e.t.) (4 – 3 pens.)	Crusaders	Windsor Park, Belfast
1997–98 (Note: The last three editions were open to First Division sides only)	Ballyclare Comrades (1)	League format	Distillery	—
1998–99	Distillery (2)	League format	Ards	—
2002–03	Dungannon Swifts (1)	League format	Ballymena United	—
2025-26	Linfield (16)	3 - 1	Dungannon Swifts	Windsor Park, Belfast

== Performance by club ==
=== Senior ===
Club	Winners	Runners-up	Winning years	Runners-up years
Linfield	16	11	1948–49, 1955–56, 1956–57, 1959–60, 1961–62, 1964–65, 1967–68, 1970–71, 1971–72, 1974–75, 1977–78, 1978–79, 1979–80, 1984–85, 1992–93, 2025-26	1950–51, 1953–54, 1965–66, 1968–69, 1973–74, 1975–76, 1980–81, 1982–83, 1986–87, 1994–95, 1995–96
Glentoran	9	6	1950–51, 1952–53, 1966–67, 1976–77, 1981–82, 1982–83, 1983–84, 1988–89, 1989–90	1957–58, 1961–62, 1964–65, 1967–68, 1969–70, 1974–75
Coleraine	8	8	1965–66, 1968–69, 1969–70, 1972–73, 1975–76, 1985–86, 1986–87, 1996–97	1954–55, 1955–56, 1962–63, 1970–71, 1977–78, 1981–82, 1983–84, 1987–88
Crusaders	3	6	1953–54, 1963–64, 1993–94	1951–52, 1958–59, 1959–60, 1978–79, 1991–92, 1996–97
Ballymena United	3	2	1951–52, 1960–61, 1980–81	1949–50, 1971–72
Glenavon	3	5	1954–55, 1958–59, 1962–63	1960–61, 1963–64, 1966–67, 1989–90, 1990–91
Larne	2	2	1949–50, 1987–88	1984–85, 1988–89
Portadown	2	2	1990–91, 1995–96	1976–77, 1985–86
Bangor	2	1	1991–92, 1994–95	1993–94
Distillery	1	3	1957–58	1952–53, 1956–57, 1972–73
Ards	1	2	1973–74	1948–49, 1992–93

=== First Division only ===
Club	Winners	Runners-up	Winning years	Runners-up years
Distillery	1	1	1998–99	1997–98
Ballyclare Comrades	1	0	1997–98	—
Dungannon Swifts	1	0	2002–03	2025-26
Ards	0	1	—	1998–99
Ballymena United	0	1	—	2002–03
