= Tommy Stewart (footballer, born 1935) =

Northern Irish footballer

Personal information
- Date of birth: 1935
- Place of birth: Belfast, Northern Ireland
- Date of death: 2 November 2006 (aged 71)
- Height: 5 ft 1/2 in (1.54 m)
- Position: Outside right

Senior career*
Years	Team	Apps	(Gls)
1956–1957	Ballymena United	27	(19)
1957–1966	Linfield		
1963	→ Hamilton Steelers (guest)		

International career
1957	Northern Ireland Amateurs	1	(0)
1960	Irish League XI	1	(0)
1961	Northern Ireland	1	(0)
- * Club domestic league appearances and goals

Thomas C. Stewart (1935 – 2 November 2006) was a Northern Irish footballer who played as an outside right and made one appearance through mitigating circumstances for the Northern Ireland national team.

== Career ==
Stewart earned his first and only cap for Northern Ireland on 12 April 1961 in the 1960–61 British Home Championship against Wales. The home match, which took place in Belfast, finished as a 1–5 loss for Northern Ireland. In the summer of 1963, he played in the Eastern Canada Professional Soccer League with Hamilton Steelers.

== Personal life ==
Stewart died on 2 November 2006 at the age of 71.

== Career statistics ==
=== International ===
Northern Ireland
Year	Apps	Goals
1961	1	0
Total	1	0
