= Gary Blackledge =

Northern Ireland footballer

Gary Blackledge (born 8 April 1958) was a Northern Ireland footballer who, playing as a forward, scored 159 goals in just over 200 games for Glentoran.

He was Ronnie McFall's first signing in 1979 when he was transferred to Glentoran from Portadown for £9,000. During his career Blackledge was named by the Northern Ireland Football Writers' Association as Player of the Month five times, which was the joint record until 2006.
