= The Oval (Belfast) =

Football stadium in Belfast, Northern Ireland

Coordinates: 54°36′10.67″N 5°53′28.75″W

The BetMcLean Oval
- The Oval
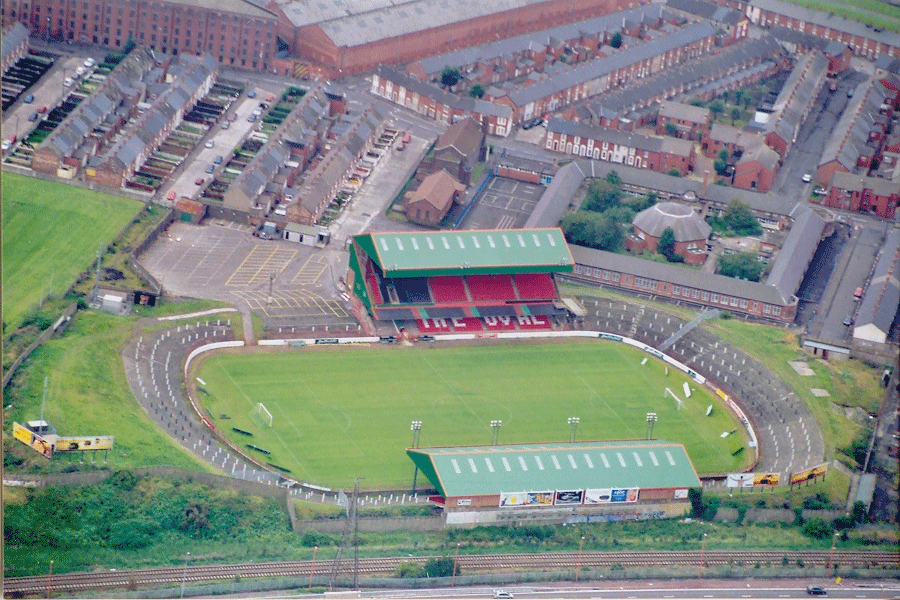
- The Oval circa 2004
- Interactive map of The BetMcLean Oval
- Location: Belfast
- Owner: Glentoran Recreation Co Ltd
- Operator: Glentoran
- Capacity: 26,556 (6,050 safe capacity)
- Record attendance: 35,000 (Glentoran vs Rangers, UEFA Cup)

Construction
- Opened: 1892
- Renovated: 2000

Tenants
- Glentoran (NIFL Premiership) (1892–1941, 1949–present); Queen's Island (1924–28)

The Oval (currently known as The BetMcLean Oval for sponsorship reasons) is a football stadium in Belfast, Northern Ireland, which has been home to Glentoran F.C. since 1892.

In 1941, the stadium was severely damaged by aerial bombing during the Belfast blitz of World War II and was unusable until 1949. A new main stand was constructed in 1953. The stadium was refurbished with a new stand built in 2000, but requires consistent maintenance to fulfill health and safety requirements and its total capacity is currently restricted to 6,050. The Oval has occasionally hosted the final of the Irish Cup as well as hosting the final of the County Antrim Shield and the Setanta Cup.

As of August 2021, the Oval has been sponsored by bookmakers A. McLeans in a five-year, £250,000 deal, with the name of the Oval becoming the BetMcLean Oval.

== History ==
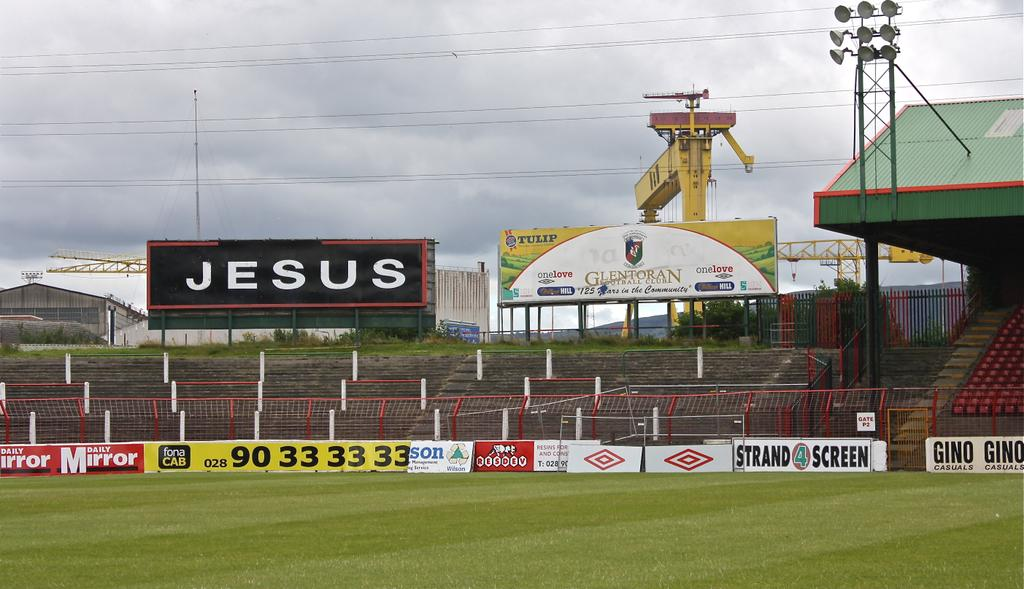
The "Jesus" sign

From 1882 to 1886, Glentoran used Ormeau Park as their home ground. They moved to Westbourne in Ballymacarrett for six years until 1892. They then moved to The Oval. Initially it was on Dee Street, however in 1903 The Oval's pitch was rotated 90 degrees to its current location. During the early 20th century, the land on which The Oval stood was given in perpetuity to Glentoran by the Lord Mayor of Belfast, Daniel Dixon.

Due to its proximity to the Belfast shipyards, the Oval suffered severe bomb damage during the Belfast Blitz in 1941. Aerial bombing destroyed both grandstands, causing the loss of Glentoran's club assets, and also left a large crater in the pitch. As a result, the ground was flooded repeatedly by the Connswater River; the water pumps were insufficient to drain the pitch. The ground was out of use until 1949 when it was rebuilt by the Glentoran club along with supporters, who had jointly formed the 'Back to the Oval' committee. During their exile, the club played games at the ground of fellow Belfast club, Lisburn Distillery – Grosvenor Park.

In 1953, the main grandstand was built.

In September 1995, Glentoran had an advertising board with "JESUS" in white letters on a black background erected at the Oval. This became known colloquially as the "Jesus sign". It remained at the ground until 2010 when club officials removed it, saying that they needed the space to sell advertising because of serious financial troubles and "the sign had garnered no income for Glentoran for several years."

In 2000, the Oval received funding for the refurbishment of the railway stand, by bolting seats on to the old terracing to create a 1,600-capacity stand. It was funded by a small grant as part of the much bigger £2,000,000 investment in Northern Irish sports announced by Sports Minister Michael McGimpsey. Other than new floodlights and a small section of terrace refurbishment, the ground has not applied for nor received any public investment since.

In 2005, after a match between Glentoran and rival team Linfield, Linfield fans broke down a gate in The Oval to access the pitch and throw objects at Glentoran fans in the main stand after both sets of fans had been throwing missiles at each other beforehand. Two people were charged with rioting.

In 2008, The Oval was the site of a protest by the Free Presbyterian Church of Ulster against a decision by the Irish Football Association to allow football matches to be played on Sundays, a first in Northern Ireland due to traditional sabbatarianism. The protesters were concerned that regular Sunday matches would attract churchgoers away from attending church. The protest was led by Reverend David McIlveen, who said "Fundamentally, it is a desecration of God's day." In October 2010 the neo-Nazi British National Party (BNP), who were trying to gain electoral support, held a rally outside the Oval. Democratic Unionist Party (DUP) Member of the Legislative Assembly, Robin Newton described the BNP's presence outside The Oval as "nauseous". In July 2011, an incendiary bomb was discovered outside The Oval requiring evacuation of surrounding streets. In October 2011 during an Irish Cup match between Glentoran and Portadown, a Portadown fan threw fireworks onto the pitch, injuring Glentoran's assistant manager Pete Batey and goalkeeping coach Davy McClelland.

In the 21st century, with the continued lack of investment, the Oval has become comparatively dilapidated and has required constant temporary repairs to fulfill health and safety requirements for Glentoran to continue hosting its home matches there. In 2009, Glentoran's Irish Cup match against Limavady United was abandoned after the stadium's floodlight pylons started shaking in the high winds and the referee deemed it too dangerous for the match to continue. In 2012, after considering selling naming rights to The Oval, Glentoran unveiled plans to move the club to a new stadium in the Titanic Quarter of Belfast. The Oval was sold to property developers in March 2013 for £4 million. Glentoran's chairman suggested that the Oval might be redeveloped into social housing.

In March 2021, Glentoran submitted plans to Belfast City Council for a major revamp for the football ground. The plans include an entire revamp of the ground, this would include building two new stands totalling 4,000 seats, and two standing terrancings at each end of the pitch with capacity 1,000 each, bringing the stadium capacity to 6,000 spectators, it is estimated to cost between £8 and £10 million.

== Location and design ==
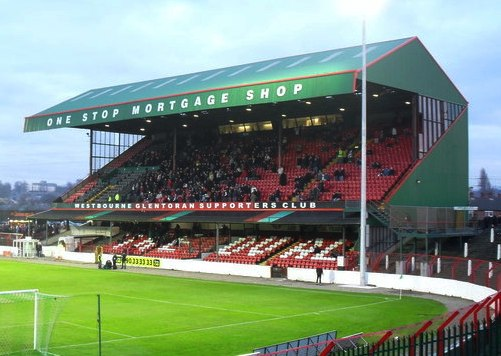
Main stand

The Oval is located near the Port of Belfast, and Harland and Wolff's Samson and Goliath cranes are visible from inside the stadium. It is viewed as a historic ground by football fans because of its concrete terraces and steel fencing. This limits its capacity in UEFA-sanctioned matches to the 3,000 seats in the two main stands as terracing has not been permitted in UEFA matches since 1998.

The stadium's capacity is 26,556, but was estimated in 2010 by the Northern Ireland Assembly to have a safe capacity of 5,056 under safety legislation. However, since 2011, the safe capacity permitted by Health and Safety authorities is 5,300; before 2010 the stadium could hold more than 8,000. Linfield's manager David Jeffrey criticised these restrictions and said that they were "murdering local football." The main stand holds 2,720 and the Railway stand holds 2,070. The Oval's record attendance is 35,000 for a European Cup Winners Cup match against Rangers on 27 September 1966.

The design of the main stand is very similar to the one at Springfield Park, former home of Wigan Athletic. This was also built in 1953.

== Finals ==
In previous years, the Oval was used to host the final of the Irish Cup as one of Northern Ireland's biggest stadiums along with Windsor Park, with the location of the final often being decided on a coin toss. During the 1985 Irish Cup final, Glentoran supporters released a cockerel and a pig that had been painted blue onto the pitch to antagonize Linfield supporters. The Oval was used to host the final of the County Antrim Shield in 2012. The Oval has also been used to host the Setanta Cup final. It hosted the 2012 final between Belfast's Crusaders representing the IFA Premiership, and Derry City, representing the League of Ireland. The 2015 Irish Cup Final between Glentoran and Portadown was played at The Oval.
