= Larne F.C. =

Association football club in Larne, Northern Ireland

Larne
- Full name: Larne Football Club
- Founded: 1889; 137 years ago
- Ground: Inver Park, Larne; County Antrim
- Capacity: 3,000
- Owner: Redball Global FC
- Chairman: Gareth Clements
- Manager: Gary Haveron
- League: NIFL Premiership
- 2025–26: NIFL Premiership, 1st of 12 (champions)
- Website: larnefc.com
Home colours	Away colours

Larne Football Club is a professional Northern Irish football club based in Larne, County Antrim, that competes in the NIFL Premiership.

== History ==
The club was founded in 1889 after Rev. Turner, Mr WN Brown and L. Jackson Holmes watched a game of football between Distillery and the Black Watch regiment of the army and thus took inspiration to create Larne FC on 14 October 1889.

The club in their early days would play against Ballyclare as well as the Fisherwick club in Doagh, when, amid the rise in football interest at the turn of the century, the club experienced relative success at a junior level, winning an IFA Junior Cup in 1901, as well as winning an Intermediate Cup and a Steel & Sons Cup prior to the outbreak of the First World War.

Larne would enter senior football for the first time in 1923, reaching two Irish Cup finals in the 1920s and 1930s, before dropping out of senior football as a consequence of World War Two.

The following decades would see a relative amount of success for the club, with a first ever senior trophy win in the Ulster Cup in 1950, as well as a dominant period in Intermediate football over the next 20 years, winning a great deal of silverware.

As a result of the departure of Derry City from Irish League football in 1972, Larne would thus take the place of the Candystripes in senior football, with numerous relatively successful Irish Cup runs however the Invermen would never make it as far as the final.

Following the appointment of Paul Malone as player/manager in 1984, the club would have quite a strong decade that spilled into the early 1990s, with several respectable league finishes and another Ulster Cup win in 1987.

The club slipped into decline from the early 1990s. Malone departed in 1991, with Larne being relegated to the old first division in 1995 with the next 8 years seeing a period of regular financial trouble and struggle to compete for promotion.

Tommy Kincaids appointment in 2001 saw a small revival for the club, achieving promotion in 2003 before Jimmy McGeough taking over in 2004. In this period the club would be defeated in the League Cup and Irish Cup finals to Cliftonville and Portadown respectively.

From 1972 until 2008, the club had senior status, but reverted to intermediate status when it failed to gain a place in the new IFA Premiership. The club regained this senior status in 2016, when the NIFL Championship became the second tier of senior football for the 2016–17 season.

Larne have notably been runners-up of the Irish Cup on six occasions (1928, 1935, 1987, 1989, 2005 and 2021) and runners-up of the League Cup twice (1991–92 and 2003–04) without ever winning either Cup – a record in both respective competitions for the most final appearances without ever winning.

=== Kenny Bruce investment era (2018–2025) ===
The club in 2018 was taken over by Purplebricks co-founder Kenny Bruce, when the club sat bottom of the NIFL Championship with relegation to the third tier looking likely, the club had been locked out of their stadium on health and safety grounds, and were experiencing financial difficulty, with the prospect of administration looming. Bruce set out the aim to bring eventual European success to Larne through investment in the playing staff and facilities.

The club in January 2018 would cause significant shock in Irish League circles when Waterford United striker David McDaid opted to sign for the NIFL Championship club amid heavy interest from Premiership side Linfield.

The club lifted the 2018–19 NIFL Championship title, comfortably finishing ahead of second-placed rivals Carrick Rangers by 17 points. This was the club's first ever senior tier league title, their first league title since an intermediate title win in 1972, and the first senior honour since lifting the Ulster Cup in 1988. This secured a return to the top flight for the first time since suffering relegation to the second tier in the 2007–08 season after failing to meet the criteria for the new IFA Premiership.

As was expected, Larne would compete in the top half of the NIFL Premiership immediately after achieving promotion, and in their first season in European competition in 2021, Larne would secure one of the biggest European wins for a Northern Irish club, knocking out Danish side Aarhus Gymnastikforening over two legs with a 2–1 win in Larne, and a draw in the away leg to set up a tie with Futebol Clube Paços de Ferreira. Following a 4–0 defeat in Portugal, Larne won the return leg 1–0 at Inver Park.

In their fourth season back in the top flight, The Inver Reds won an historic first NIFL Premiership title in 2023 following a 2–0 win over Crusaders in April 2023. Larne were part of an intense title race with Linfield.

As a result of their title victory, the club would make their first ever appearance in the qualifiers for the UEFA Champions League in the summer of 2023, taking on Finnish giants HJK Helsinki. After a 1–0 loss in Helsinki, the Inver Reds took the tie to extra time in Belfast, with the game ending 2–2. Larne lost 3–2 on aggregate.

Larne has won four County Antrim Shields in a row, from the 2020–21 to 2023–24 seasons. They are the only team other than Linfield to achieve this feat.

The 2023–24 season saw Larne go up against Cliftonville and Linfield for the title. Cliftonville fell short and finished third, while Larne edged out Linfield to claim the title for a second consecutive time.

In the 2024–25 season, Larne would defeat Ballkani on penalties and Lincoln Red Imps to reach the league stage of the 2024–25 UEFA Conference League, becoming the first side from Northern Ireland to do so in the current era of UEFA competition, with Ards competing in the group stages of the old Intertoto Cup in 1997.

In October 2024, it was announced that Larne FC agreed a six-figure agreement with luxury watch dealers Pride and Pinion, believed to be the biggest sponsorship deal in NIFL history. Pride and Pinion's owner, YouTuber Nico Leonard van der Horst, stated that he was "very proud and very excited to be involved with this incredible club."

Larne struggled in the early games of the UEFA Conference League, suffering a 3–0 defeat away to Molde, and a 4–1 defeat at home to Shamrock Rovers, the latter of which was viewed as a disappointing result, as many expected Larne to compete to a better standard with the Dublin side. Larne lost narrowly 2–1 to Swiss side St Gallen, in what was a commendable performance against much superior opposition for the Inver Reds. Larne won their last game 1–0 against Belgian team KAA Gent.

=== New ownership transition (2025–present) ===
In July 2025, Kenny Bruce sold his 50% shareholding in Larne FC to Redball Global FC, an international sports investment group. This marked the end of Bruce’s eight‑year tenure, during which he transformed the club's fortunes—from near‑relegation and financial uncertainty to back‑to‑back NIFL Premiership titles, historic European qualification, and stadium redevelopment. As part of the transition, Nick Giannotti and Eric Perez joined the club's board of directors.

Kenny Bruce stated the move aligned with his goal of handing over the club to those capable of sustaining its competitive momentum. He affirmed his ongoing support, including continuing involvement in projects like the new main stand at Inver Park. Minority shareholder Night Train Veeck welcomed the new ownership, citing their shared commitment to community integration and long‑term club growth.

The club would win the league again in the 2025-2026 season, progressing well in the UEFA qualifiers, facing off against Tre Flori of San Marino, and defeats to Red Star Belgrade and Iberia FC 1999 of Georgia saw the Inver Reds in another Uefa Conference League play-off against Lincoln Red Imps.

=== Larne women's team ===
Larne also have a women's team who were originally formed in November 2004, before being reincorporated back into the club in 2018, having been previously dormant for a number of years. In their inaugural season, they finished the season as the unbeaten North 2 League Champions, and also as beaten finalists in the North 2 League Cup. They now for the first time play in the top tier in 2023 (NIFL Women's Irish Premiership) of the Northern Ireland Women's football league system after 4 consecutive promotions.

== Current squad ==
As of 21 July 2026

Note: Flags indicate national team as defined under FIFA eligibility rules; some limited exceptions apply. Players may hold more than one non-FIFA nationality.

No.	Pos.	Nation	Player
1	GK	SCO	Rohan Ferguson
2	DF	NIR	Logan Wallace
3	DF	ENG	Matt Ridley
4	DF	NIR	Aaron Donnelly
5	DF	NIR	Sam McClelland
6	MF	NIR	Chris Gallagher
7	FW	NIR	Conor McKendry
8	MF	ENG	Mark Randall
9	FW	NIR	Paul O'Neill
10	FW	NIR	Tiarnan O'Connor
11	DF	NIR	Sean Graham
14	FW	NIR	Benji Magee
15	MF	IRL	Ronan Doherty
17	FW	IRL	Josh Ukek

No.	Pos.	Nation	Player
19	FW	SCO	Kevin O'Hara
21	MF	NIR	Leroy Millar (vice-captain)
22	MF	IRL	Jordan McEneff
23	DF	NIR	Tomás Cosgrove (captain)
25	MF	NIR	Dylan Sloan
26	MF	GIB	Dan Bent
30	FW	NIR	Matthew Lusty
31	GK	NIR	Dan Collett
45	FW	ENG	Montel Gibson
47	DF	NIR	James Simpson
48	MF	NIR	Alex McAlister
TBA	DF	ENG	Alex Wilkie
TBA	GK	ENG	Jacob Carney

=== On loan ===
Note: Flags indicate national team as defined under FIFA eligibility rules; some limited exceptions apply. Players may hold more than one non-FIFA nationality.

No.	Pos.	Nation	Player
36	GK	NIR	Dylan Graham (On loan at Annagh United until 1st July 2026)
—	DF	NIR	Noah McDonnell (On loan at H&W Welders until 1st July 2026)

== Non-playing staff ==
Position	Staff
Head coach	(Northern Ireland) Gary Haveron
Assistant coach	(Northern Ireland) Jeff Hughes
Assistant coach	(Northern Ireland) Mick O'Boyle
Goalkeeping coach	(Northern Ireland) Alan Mannus

== European record ==
=== Overview ===
Competition	Matches	W	D	L	GF	GA
UEFA Champions League	6	2	1	3	5	11
UEFA Europa Conference League	18	6	1	11	14	29

=== Matches ===
Season	Competition	Round	Club	Home	Away	Aggregate
2021–22	UEFA Europa Conference League	1QR	(Wales) Bala Town	1–0	1–0	2–0
2021–22	UEFA Europa Conference League	2QR	(Denmark) AGF Aarhus	2–1	1–1	3–2
2021–22	UEFA Europa Conference League	3QR	(Portugal) Paços de Ferreira	1–0	0–4	1–4
2022–23	UEFA Europa Conference League	1QR	(Gibraltar) St Joseph's	0–1	0–0	0–1
2023–24	UEFA Champions League	1QR	(Finland) HJK	2–2 (a.e.t.)	0–1	2–3
2023–24	UEFA Europa Conference League	2QR	(Kosovo) Ballkani	1–4	0–3	1–7
2024–25	UEFA Champions League	1QR	(Latvia) RFS	0–4	0–3	0−7
2024–25	UEFA Conference League	2QR	Bye	—N/a	—N/a	—N/a
2024–25	UEFA Conference League	3QR	(Kosovo) Ballkani	0–1	1–0	1–1 (4–1 p.)
2024–25	UEFA Conference League	PO	(Gibraltar) Lincoln Red Imps	3–1	1–2	4–3
2024–25	UEFA Conference League	League phase	(Norway) Molde	—N/a	0–3	34th
2024–25	UEFA Conference League	League phase	(Republic of Ireland) Shamrock Rovers	1–4	—N/a	34th
2024–25	UEFA Conference League	League phase	(Switzerland) St. Gallen	1–2	—N/a	34th
2024–25	UEFA Conference League	League phase	(Slovenia) Olimpija Ljubljana	—N/a	0–1	34th
2024–25	UEFA Conference League	League phase	(Belarus) Dinamo Minsk	—N/a	0–2	34th
2024–25	UEFA Conference League	League phase	(Belgium) Gent	1–0	—N/a	34th
2025–26	UEFA Conference League	1QR	(Latvia) Auda	0–0	2–2 (a.e.t.)	2–2 (4–2 p.)
2025–26	UEFA Conference League	2QR	(Kosovo) Prishtina	0–0	1–1 (a.e.t.)	1–1 (5–4 p.)
2025–26	UEFA Conference League	3QR	(Portugal) Santa Clara	0–3	0–0	0–3
2026–27	UEFA Champions League	1QR	(San Marino) Tre Fiori	2–1	1–0	3–1
2026–27	UEFA Champions League	2QR	(Serbia) Red Star Belgrade	0–4	0–5	0–9
2026–27	UEFA Europa League	3QR	(Georgia (country)) Iberia 1999	0–0	1–2 (a.e.t.)	1–2
2026–27	UEFA Conference League	PO	(Gibraltar) Lincoln Red Imps	2–0	0-3	2–3

=== UEFA ranking ===
As of 3 August 2025

Rank	Team	Points
182	(Greece) Aris	7.000
188	(Sweden) Häcken	7.000
189	(Kosovo) Drita	7.000
190	(Northern Ireland) Larne	7.000
191	(Denmark) Brøndby	7.000
192	(Northern Ireland) Linfield	7.000

== Honours ==
=== Senior honours ===
- NIFL Premiership: 3
  - 2022–23, 2023–24, 2025–26
- County Antrim Shield: 4
  - 2020–21, 2021–22, 2022–23, 2023–24
- NIFL Charity Shield: 2
  - 2024, 2026
- NIFL Championship: 1
  - 2018–19
- Ulster Cup: 2
  - 1949–50, 1987–88

=== Intermediate honours ===
- Irish League B Division: 10
  - 1954–55, 1956–57, 1963–64, 1964–65, 1965–66, 1966–67, 1968–69, 1969–70, 1970–71, 1971–72
- Irish Intermediate League: 1
  - 1952–53
- Irish Intermediate Cup: 3
  - 1942–43†, 1958–59, 1969–70
- George Wilson Cup: 6
  - 1958–59, 1959–60, 1968–69, 1970–71, 1977–78†, 1978–79†
- Steel & Sons Cup: 11
  - 1909–10, 1941–42†, 1942–43†, 1956–57, 1958–59, 1959–60, 1964–65, 1968–69, 1969–70, 1970–71, 1971–72
- Louis Moore Cup: 2
  - 1956–57 (shared with Banbridge Town), 1958–59
- McElroy Cup: 1
  - 1948–49

† Won by Larne Olympic (reserve team)

=== Junior honours ===
- Irish Junior Cup: 1
  - 1900–01
