= 2022 FAI Cup final =

Irish football cup final in 2022

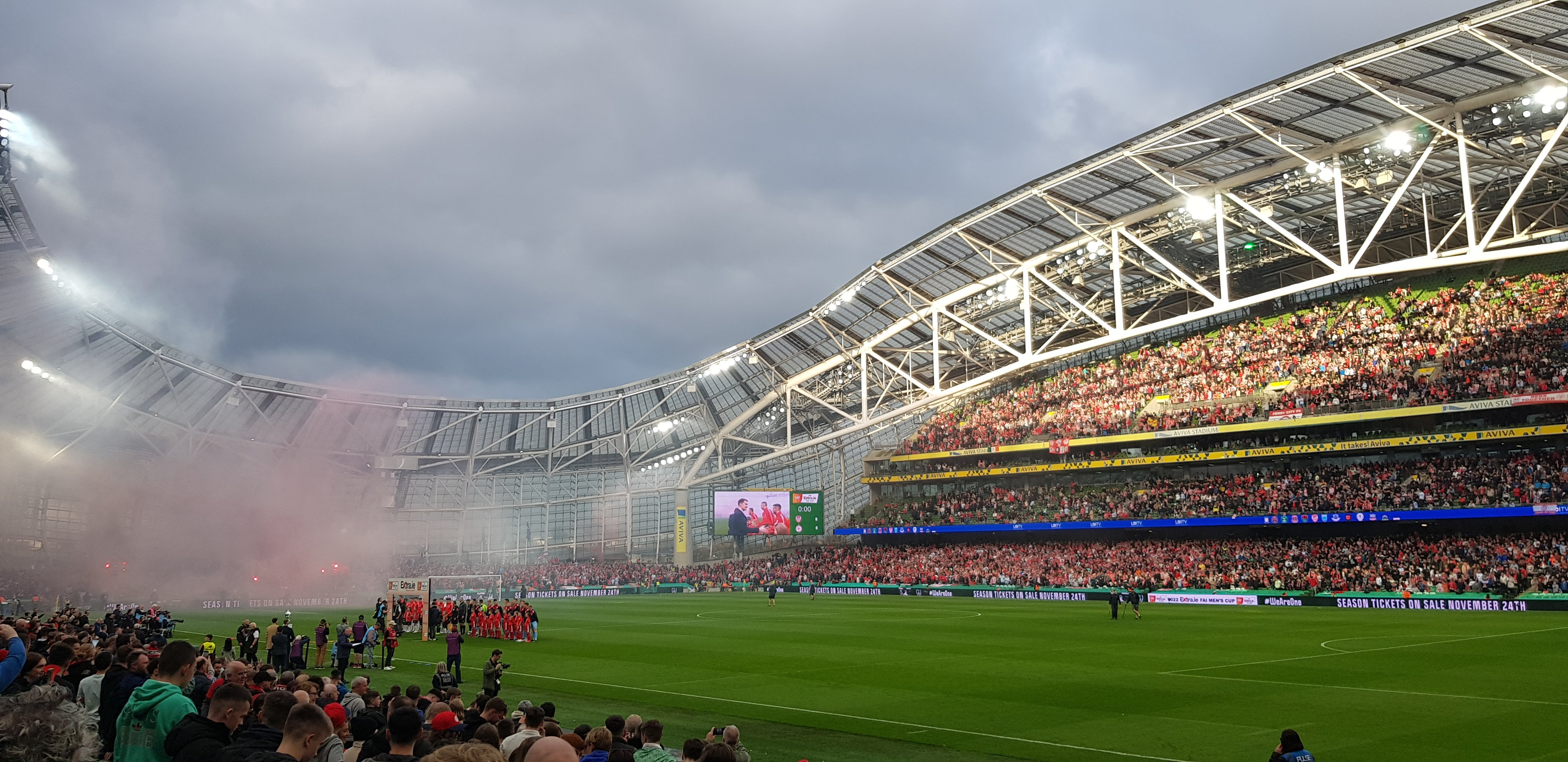
- The teams lining up before kick-off at the 2022 final
- Event: 2022 FAI Cup
Derry City	Shelbourne
4	0
- Date: 13 November 2022
- Venue: Aviva Stadium, Dublin
- Referee: Damien MacGraith
- Attendance: 32,412
- Weather: Mostly Cloudy; 15 °C (59 °F)

The 2022 FAI Cup final, known as the 2022 Extra.ie FAI Cup final for sponsorship reasons, was the final match of the 2022 FAI Cup, the national association football cup of the Republic of Ireland. The match took place on Sunday 13 November at the Aviva Stadium in Dublin and was contested by Derry City and Shelbourne. Over 32,000 spectators attended the match.

Derry City won the game 4-0 to win the cup for the sixth time, it was also the biggest margin of victory in an FAI cup final.

== Route to the final ==
=== Derry City ===
30 July 2022 1st Round	Derry City (1)	7–0	Oliver Bond Celtic (3)	Derry, Northern Ireland
17:00	James Akintunde 8'; Declan Glass 25'; Declan Glass 28'; Declan Glass 40' (pen.); Mark Connolly 74'; Jamie McGonigle 86'	Report		Stadium: Ryan McBride Brandywell Stadium; Referee: Derek Tomney

26 August 2022 2nd Round	Derry City (1)	2–0	Cork City (2)	Derry, Northern Ireland
19:45	Will Patching 11' (pen.); Sadou Diallo 73'	Report	Ruairí Keating (red card) 51'	Stadium: Ryan McBride Brandywell Stadium; Attendance: 3,600 (Est.); Referee: Gavin Colfer

18 September 2022 Quarter Final	Derry City (1)	3–1 (a.e.t.)	Shamrock Rovers (1)	Derry, Northern Ireland
17:00	Jamie McGonigle 19'; Daniel Lafferty 96'; Brandon Kavanagh 110'	Report	Lee Grace (red card) 38'; Rory Gaffney 66'	Stadium: Ryan McBride Brandywell Stadium

16 October 2022 Semi Final	Derry City (1)	2–1	Treaty United (2)	Derry, Northern Ireland
14:00	J. McGonigle 8'; B. Kavanagh 16'	Report	29' (pen.) E. Curran	Stadium: Ryan McBride Brandywell Stadium; Referee: Neil Doyle

=== Shelbourne ===
29 July 2022 1st Round	Bray Wanderers	0–3	Shelbourne	Bray, County Wicklow
19:45 IST		Report; Highlights	Boyd 5', 11'; Moylan 66'	Stadium: Carlisle Grounds

26 August 2022 2nd Round	Bonagee United	0–4	Shelbourne	Letterkenny, County Donegal
20:00 IST		Report; Highlights	Giurgi 45'; Carr 53', 73'; Moylan 60'	Stadium: Dry Arch Park

18 September 2022 Quarter Final	Shelbourne	3–0	Bohemians	Drumcondra, Dublin
14:00 IST	Moylan 20'; Boyd 38', 73'	Report; Highlights		Stadium: Tolka Park; Attendance: 4,500; Referee: Robert Harvey

16 October 2022 Semi Final	Waterford	0–1	Shelbourne	Waterford
16:45 IST		Report; Highlights	Molloy 16'	Stadium: Waterford Regional Sports Centre; Attendance: 4,952; Referee: Rob Hennessey

== Pre-match ==
Derry City had won the cup on five previous occasions, 1989, 1995, 2002, 2006, and 2012. Shelbourne had won it seven times in 1939, 1960, 1963, 1993, 1996, 1997, and 2000. The two teams previously met in the 1997 FAI Cup final with Shelbourne winning the game 2-0. The match was broadcast live on RTÉ Two and RTÉ Two HD in the Republic of Ireland and Northern Ireland, via RTE Radio 1 Sunday Sport and via the RTÉ Player worldwide.

== Match ==
=== Summary ===
The opening goal came in the 18th minute, when Jamie McGonigle finished into the left corner of the net after a low cross from Ryan Graydon on the right. It was 2-0 in the 35th minute when Cameron McJannet scored from six yards out after the ball broke to him from a clearance by Shelbourne defender Shane Griffin. In the 61st minute McJannet got his second and Derry's third when the ball came off his knee and into the net from a corner on the left by Michael Duffy. In injury time Derry were awarded a penalty when Jordan McEneff was brought down from behind in the area by Luke Byrne, with McEneff making it 4-0 shooting the penalty down the middle of the net.

=== Details ===
13 November 2022
15:00

Derry City	4–0	Shelbourne
Jamie McGonigle 18'; Cameron McJannet 35'; Cameron McJannet 61'; Jordan McEneff 90+2' (pen.)	Report

Aviva Stadium, Dublin
Attendance: 32,412
Referee: Damien McGrath
