= Sobowale =

Sobowale is a surname. Notable people with the surname include:

- Ronald Sobowale (born 1997), English footballer
- Sola Sobowale (born 1965), Nigerian actress
- Timi Sobowale (born 2002), Irish footballer
- Tunmise Sobowale (born 1999), Irish footballer
