= 1967–68 Top Four Cup =

Tournament details
- Country: Northern Ireland
- Teams: 4

Final positions
- Champions: Linfield (2nd title)
- Runners-up: Coleraine

Tournament statistics
- Matches played: 5
- Goals scored: 17 (3.4 per match)

The 1967–68 Top Four Cup was the 3rd edition of the Top Four Cup, a cup competition in Northern Irish football.

The tournament was won by Linfield for the 2nd time and 2nd season in a row, defeating Coleraine 3–1 in the final replay at Solitude after the original final had ended 2-2.

== Results ==
=== Semi-finals ===
Team 1	Score	Team 2
Coleraine	2–0	Ards
Linfield	2–2	Glentoran

==== Playoff ====
Team 1	Score	Team 2
Glentoran	1–2	Linfield

=== Final ===
16 May 1968

Linfield	2–2	Coleraine
Hamilton 37'; Scott 81'	Report	Halliday 30'; Gaston 68'

Solitude, Belfast
Referee: M. Fussey (Retford)

==== Replay ====
30 May 1968

Linfield	3–1 (a.e.t.)	Coleraine
Hamilton 75', 106'; Pavis 102'	Report	Moore 83'

Solitude, Belfast
