= Bertie Peacock =

Northern Irish footballer and manager

Bertie Peacock MBE
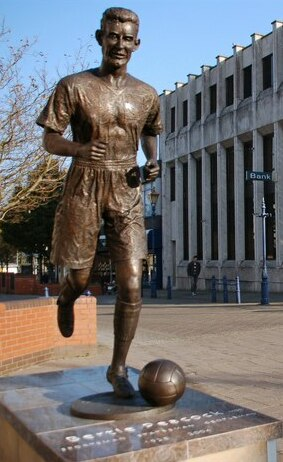
- Statue of Peacock in Coleraine

Personal information
- Full name: John Robert Peacock
- Date of birth: 29 September 1928
- Place of birth: Coleraine, Northern Ireland
- Date of death: 22 July 2004 (aged 75)
- Position: Defender

Senior career*
Years	Team	Apps	(Gls)
1946–1948	Coleraine	5	(1)
1948–1949	Glentoran	8	(1)
1949–1961	Celtic	318	(33)
1961–1971	Coleraine	?	(?)
1962	→ Morton (loan)	0	(0)
1962	→ Hamilton Steelers (loan)	?	(?)

International career
1949–1961	Northern Ireland	31	(2)
1955	United Kingdom	1	(0)

Managerial career
- 1961–1974: Coleraine F.C.
- 1962–1967: Northern Ireland
- * Club domestic league appearances and goals

John Robert 'Bertie' Peacock MBE (29 September 1928 – 22 July 2004) was a Northern Ireland international footballer and manager who played for Celtic.

== Playing career ==
After starting his career with local side Coleraine F.C., Peacock moved on to Belfast club Glentoran in 1947. After two years he was signed by Glasgow club, Celtic, where he would go on to become captain and a club legend. During his time at the club he won one league title, two Scottish Cups and two Scottish League Cups. In 1962, he played in the Eastern Canada Professional Soccer League with Hamilton Steelers, where he served as a player-coach.

Peacock won 31 caps for Northern Ireland. He featured alongside Harry Gregg, Danny Blanchflower and Billy Bingham in the team that reached the last eight in the 1958 World Cup, the country's furthest progress to date.

== Managerial career ==
Peacock became Northern Ireland manager a year after his retirement as a footballer in 1961, giving George Best his first start. In the 1960s he returned to Coleraine, winning the Irish League title in 1973–74. Under Peacock, Coleraine became the first football club from the United Kingdom to play behind the Iron Curtain, when they faced Dynamo Kyiv in the 1965–66 European Cup Winners' Cup. In the 1970–71 Fairs Cup, Coleraine defeated Kilmarnock on aggregate, with Des Dickson scoring a hat-trick in the away leg in Scotland as Coleraine won 3–2 at Rugby Park. Peacock briefly came out of retirement when he came on as a substitute against Shamrock Rovers in the Texaco Cup in September 1971. It was his last game for Coleraine as they lost 3–0 at The Showgrounds (Coleraine).

He was also assistant manager to Billy Bingham during Northern Ireland's 1982 World Cup campaign, where they famously knocked out hosts Spain in Valencia.

== Later life and legacy ==
Alongside Jim Weir and Victor Leonard, Peacock was one of the founders of the Milk Cup. Held in his native Coleraine, the youth football competition started with sixteen teams in 1982 and rose to become one of the most respected tournaments in the world.

In 1986 he was awarded the MBE for his services to football. He died in 2004, aged 76.

In June 2006 a statue of Peacock was commissioned. The memorial stands in Coleraine and was unveiled by Pat Jennings in July 2007, at the opening of the 25th Milk Cup.

Also in 2006, a youth football club was formed in his honour: Bertie Peacocks Youths. This club has a range of teams from under-7 to under-16. In only two years, the teams have been very successful - the under-11s in particular, winning the Down and Connor League, the Down and Connor Knock-Out Cup and becoming Northern Ireland Boys Champions all in the 2008 season. This club has had much encouragement from the wide supporters of Bertie Peacock.

== Honours ==
=== Player ===
Coleraine

- Blaxnit Cup: 1969

Celtic

- Scottish Football League: 1953–54
- Scottish Cup: 1950–51, 1953–54
- Scottish League Cup: 1956–57, 1957–58

=== Manager ===
Coleraine

- Irish League: 1973–74

Preceded by Bobby Evans	Celtic F.C. captain 1957–1961	Succeeded by Duncan MacKay
