= 1966–67 Top Four Cup =

Tournament details
- Country: Northern Ireland
- Teams: 4

Final positions
- Champions: Linfield (1st title)
- Runners-up: Coleraine

Tournament statistics
- Matches played: 2
- Goals scored: 7 (3.5 per match)

The 1966–67 Top Four Cup was the 2nd edition of the Top Four Cup, a cup competition in Northern Irish football.

The tournament was won by Linfield for the first time, defeating Coleraine 2–1 in the final at Solitude.

== Results ==
=== Semi-finals ===
Team 1	Score	Team 2
Derry City	1–3	Coleraine
Linfield	w/o^{1}	Glentoran

^{1}Linfield were awarded the tie after Glentoran refused to play at Solitude.

=== Final ===
17 May 1967

Linfield	2–1	Coleraine
Leishman 13'; Wood 80' (pen.)	Report	Murray 40'

Solitude, Belfast
Referee: J. Lawther (Belfast)
