= 1968–69 Blaxnit Cup =

Tournament details
- Country: Northern Ireland; Republic of Ireland
- Teams: 8

Final positions
- Champions: Coleraine (1st title)
- Runners-up: Shamrock Rovers

Tournament statistics
- Matches played: 8
- Goals scored: 23 (2.88 per match)

The 1968–69 Blaxnit Cup was the 2nd edition of the Blaxnit Cup, an association football cup competition featuring teams from Northern Ireland and the Republic of Ireland.

Coleraine won the title for the 1st time, defeating Shamrock Rovers 4–3 on aggregate in the two-legged final.

== Results ==
=== Quarter-finals ===
Team 1	Score	Team 2
Coleraine	4–0	Cork Celtic
Glentoran	0–2	Shamrock Rovers
Limerick	2–1	Ards
Shelbourne	3–0	Distillery

=== Semi-finals ===
Team 1	Score	Team 2
Coleraine	2–1	Limerick
Shamrock Rovers	1–0	Shelbourne

=== Final ===
20 May 1969

Coleraine	2–1	Shamrock Rovers
Curley 24'; Jennings 43'	Report	Leech 66'

Windsor Park, Belfast
Attendance: 7,000
Referee: W. A. O'Neill (Dublin)

23 May 1969

Shamrock Rovers	2–2	Coleraine
Lawlor 10'; O'Neill 25'	Report	Kearin 75' (o.g.); Dickson 87'

Dalymount Park, Dublin
Referee: Jack Adair (Belfast)

Coleraine win 4–3 on aggregate.
