= 1957–58 Irish League =

Irish League
- Season: 1957–58
- Champions: Ards; 1st Irish title
- Matches played: 132
- Goals scored: 589 (4.46 per match)
- Top goalscorer: Jackie Milburn (29 goals)

Location of teams in the Irish League from 1949–1972
Location of Belfast-based teams in the Irish League from 1949–1972

The 1957–58 Irish League was the 57th edition of the Irish League, the highest level of league competition in Northern Irish football. The league comprised 12 teams, and Ards won the championship.

== League standings ==
Pos	Team	Pld	W	D	L	GF	GA	GR	Pts	Qualification
1	Ards (C)	22	16	4	2	68	32	2.125	36	Qualification for the European Cup preliminary round
2	Glenavon	22	17	0	5	67	35	1.914	34	
3	Ballymena United	22	13	2	7	51	41	1.244	28	
4	Glentoran	22	12	1	9	50	38	1.316	25	
5	Linfield	22	11	3	8	68	48	1.417	25	
6	Bangor	22	9	3	10	40	48	0.833	21	
7	Coleraine	22	8	5	9	53	59	0.898	21	
8	Derry City	22	8	4	10	40	44	0.909	20	
9	Portadown	22	7	3	12	43	48	0.896	17	
10	Distillery	22	5	6	11	36	53	0.679	16	
11	Crusaders	22	7	1	14	38	57	0.667	15	
12	Cliftonville	22	2	2	18	35	86	0.407	6	

Source: rsssf.com
(C) Champions

== Results ==
Home \ Away	ARD	BAN	BLM	CLI	COL	CRU	DIS	DER	GLV	GLT	LIN	POR
Ards		5–2	3–0	7–2	3–4	6–1	2–2	2–1	3–4	5–1	3–0	3–2
Bangor	1–2		0–2	5–1	2–1	1–1	2–1	4–0	1–2	2–0	1–2	2–0
Ballymena United	1–1	1–3		4–0	2–2	4–2	3–2	2–1	3–2	5–1	3–1	1–0
Cliftonville	3–4	1–1	2–4		4–4	4–3	3–2	0–2	0–1	2–6	1–7	1–2
Coleraine	1–3	6–1	4–2	2–1		1–3	1–2	1–0	2–8	2–1	4–3	2–3
Crusaders	1–4	1–2	5–2	4–2	2–4		2–3	2–4	1–0	0–1	2–6	0–3
Distillery	1–1	2–3	0–5	3–2	2–2	0–1		2–2	2–4	1–3	1–0	0–6
Derry City	0–1	4–1	1–2	6–1	2–2	2–1	2–2		2–3	0–1	3–2	2–2
Glenavon	0–3	5–0	2–1	6–3	2–1	1–0	3–0	7–1		5–1	2–3	5–2
Glentoran	0–1	3–0	3–1	7–0	5–1	5–2	3–2	5–1	0–1		0–2	2–1
Linfield	4–4	5–3	5–1	4–1	3–3	2–3	3–3	0–2	4–1	3–1		3–4
Portadown	1–2	3–3	1–2	2–1	5–3	0–1	0–3	1–2	2–3	1–1	2–6	

Source: Irish League Archive
Legend: Blue = home team win; Yellow = draw; Red = away team win.
