= 1972–73 Blaxnit Cup =

Tournament details
- Country: Northern Ireland; Republic of Ireland
- Teams: 2

Final positions
- Champions: Glentoran (1st title)
- Runners-up: Cork Hibernians

Tournament statistics
- Matches played: 2
- Goals scored: 8 (4 per match)

The 1972–73 Blaxnit Cup was the 6th edition of the Blaxnit Cup, an association football cup competition featuring teams from Northern Ireland and the Republic of Ireland. Only two teams competed due to the security situation in Northern Ireland.

Glentoran won the title for the 1st time, defeating Cork Hibernians 6–2 on aggregate in the two-legged final.

== Results ==
=== Final ===
23 May 1973

Cork Hibernians	1–1	Glentoran
Allen 70'	Report	Sheehan 17' (o.g.)

Flower Lodge, Cork
Referee: D. V. Byrne (Dublin)

25 May 1973

Glentoran	5–1	Cork Hibernians
Jamison 28'; Anderson 65'; Feeney 72'; Weatherup 87', 89'	Report	Allen 42'

Castlereagh Park, Newtownards
Attendance: 5,000
Referee: Malcolm Wright (Portadown)

Glentoran win 6–2 on aggregate.
