= 1967–68 Blaxnit Cup =

Tournament details
- Country: Northern Ireland; Republic of Ireland
- Teams: 8

Final positions
- Champions: Shamrock Rovers (1st title)
- Runners-up: Crusaders

Tournament statistics
- Matches played: 8
- Goals scored: 23 (2.88 per match)

The 1967–68 Blaxnit Cup was the inaugural edition of the Blaxnit Cup, an association football cup competition featuring teams from Northern Ireland and the Republic of Ireland.

Shamrock Rovers won the title for the 1st time, defeating Crusaders 3–2 on aggregate in the two-legged final.

== Results ==
=== Quarter-finals ===
Team 1	Score	Team 2
Ards	0–3	Shamrock Rovers
Crusaders	6–1	Drumcondra
Dundalk	1–0	Derry City
Waterford	3–2	Linfield

=== Semi-finals ===
Team 1	Score	Team 2
Crusaders	1–0	Dundalk
Shamrock Rovers	1–0	Waterford

=== Final ===
20 May 1968

Crusaders	0–2	Shamrock Rovers
	Report	Lawlor 24'; Leech 84'

Windsor Park, Belfast
Attendance: 12,000
Referee: W. A. O'Neill (Dublin)

22 May 1968

Shamrock Rovers	1–2	Crusaders
Lawlor 57'	Report	Trainor 3'; McPolin 68'

Dalymount Park, Dublin
Attendance: 12,000
Referee: Malcolm Wright (Portadown)

Shamrock Rovers win 3–2 on aggregate.
