= 1970–71 Blaxnit Cup =

Tournament details
- Country: Northern Ireland; Republic of Ireland
- Teams: 8

Final positions
- Champions: Linfield (1st title)
- Runners-up: Cork Hibernians

Tournament statistics
- Matches played: 9
- Goals scored: 23 (2.56 per match)

The 1970–71 Blaxnit Cup was the 4th edition of the Blaxnit Cup, an association football cup competition featuring teams from Northern Ireland and the Republic of Ireland.

Linfield won the title for the 1st time, defeating Cork Hibernians 3–2 on aggregate in the two-legged final.

== Results ==
=== Quarter-finals ===
Team 1	Score	Team 2
Coleraine	1–0	Limerick
Cork Hibernians	2–0	Distillery
Drogheda United	2–1	Derry City
Linfield	2–0	St Patrick's Athletic

=== Semi-finals ===
Team 1	Score	Team 2
Cork Hibernians	2–0	Coleraine
Linfield	3–3	Drogheda United

==== Replay ====
Team 1	Score	Team 2
Drogheda United	1–1 (a.e.t.) (4–5 p)	Linfield

=== Final ===
19 May 1971

Linfield	1–1	Cork Hibernians
McAteer 65'	Report	Marsden 15'

Windsor Park, Belfast
Referee: F. Boylan (Dublin)

21 May 1971

Cork Hibernians	1–2	Linfield
Wallace 2'	Report	Cathcart 13'; Magee 22'

Dalymount Park, Dublin
Referee: Malcolm Wright (Portadown)

Linfield win 3–2 on aggregate.
