= Guillaume Keke =

French footballer (born 1991)

Personal information
- Date of birth: March 13, 1991 (age 35)
- Place of birth: Paris, France
- Position: Striker

Team information
- Current team: Lisburn Distillery

Senior career*
Years	Team	Apps	(Gls)
–2012	Boulogne-Billancourt		
2012–2013	Xagħra United		
2013	Évry	3	(1)
2014	Olympique Noisy-le-Sec	4	(0)
2015	Cliftonville	4	(0)
2015–2016	Larne		
2016–2018	Ards	60	(12)
2018–2019	Ivry	24	(5)
2019	Versailles 78	1	(0)
2019–2020	Carrick Rangers	19	(3)
2020	Dungannon Swifts	2	(0)
2020–2021	Dundela	21	(4)
2022–2023	Ballymacash Rangers	20	(4)
2023	Knockbreda	15	(4)
2024	Ards	6	(0)
2025-	Lisburn Distillery	30	(9)
- * Club domestic league appearances and goals

Guillaume Keke (born 13 March 1991) is a French footballer who plays as a striker for Lisburn Distillery.

== Early life ==
Keke is a native of Paris, France. He is of mixed French and Ivorian descent.

== Club career ==
Keke started his career with French side AC Boulogne-Billancourt. In 2012, he signed for Maltese side Xagħra United FC. In 2013, he signed for French side Évry. In 2014, he signed for French side Olympique Noisy-le-Sec. In 2015, he signed for Northern Irish side Cliftonville. After that, he signed for Northern Irish side Larne. He scored his first goal for the club during a 4–1 loss to Portadown. In 2016, he signed for Northern Irish side Ards. He initially was described as "struggled to get things off the ground". He helped the club finish eighth place after they were promoted. He was regarded as one of the club's most important players. He was their top scorer with twelve goals. In 2018, he signed for French side US Ivry. In 2019, he signed for French side FC Versailles 78. After that, he signed for Northern Irish side Carrick Rangers. In 2020, he signed for Northern Irish side Dungannon Swifts. After that, he signed for Northern Irish side Dundela. In 2022, he signed for Northern Irish side Ballymacash Rangers. In 2023, he signed for Northern Irish side Knockbreda. In 2024, he signed for Northern Irish side Ards. In 2025, he signed for Northern Irish side Lisburn Distillery.

== International career ==
Besides football, Keke is a futsal player. He represented Northern Ireland internationally at the Red Bull Neymar Jr's Five World Finals 2017.

== Style of play ==
Keke mainly operates as a striker. He has been described as a "strong hard working striker who likes to run in behind with a keen eye for goal".

== Personal life ==
Keke has a daughter. He has an uncle who lived in Northern Ireland. He has studied to become a personal trainer.
