= Tunmise Sobowale =

Irish footballer (born 1999)

Personal information
- Full name: Oluwatunmise Sobowale
- Date of birth: 19 March 1999 (age 27)
- Place of birth: Waterford, Ireland
- Height: 1.90 m (6 ft 3 in)
- Position: Wing back

Team information
- Current team: Shamrock Rovers
- Number: 22

Youth career
- Villa
- Waterford

Senior career*
Years	Team	Apps	(Gls)
2016–2017	Waterford	5	(0)
2018	Hércules	0	(0)
2018	Finn Harps	7	(1)
2020–2023	Waterford	67	(4)
2021	→ Athlone Town (loan)	10	(0)
2023–2024	Shrewsbury Town	29	(0)
2024–2025	Swindon Town	37	(0)
2025–2026	St Mirren	6	(0)
2026	→ Shamrock Rovers (loan)	23	(1)
2026–	Shamrock Rovers	11	(0)
- * Club domestic league appearances and goals as of 17:27, 9 November 2026 (UTC)

Oluwatunmise Sobowale (born 19 March 1999) is an Irish professional footballer who plays as a wing-back for League of Ireland Premier Division club Shamrock Rovers.

== Career ==
Born in Waterford, Sobowale played for local club Villa, then came through the academy of local League of Ireland side Waterford, and in May 2016 won the SFAI U17 Munster Schools Cup with his school side Mount Sion, beating Cork school Nagle Community College 2–1 in the final, alongside his brother Timi.

Sobowale began his senior career with Waterford, making his debut in 2016 before moving to Spanish side Hércules. He moved to Finn Harps in July 2018. He scored on his debut for Finn Harps in a 3–0 win over Longford Town on 13 July 2018. Sobowale returned to his hometown club Waterford in July 2020. He signed a new contract with the club in February 2021, alongside teammate Darragh Power. In July 2021, he signed for League of Ireland First Division side Athlone Town on loan until the end of the season.

In July 2023, Sobowale was sold to EFL League One club Shrewsbury Town for an undisclosed fee. He made his debut for the club on 9 August 2023, coming off the bench in the 77th minute of a 2–1 EFL Cup defeat to Leeds United at Elland Road. He was released by Shrewsbury at the end of the 2023–24 season.

On 10 June 2024, EFL League Two side Swindon Town announced the signing of Sobowale, with effect from 1 July.

On 19 July 2025, Sobowale joined Scottish Premiership side St Mirren on a two-year deal.

On 20 February 2026, Sobowale signed on loan for League of Ireland Premier Division club Shamrock Rovers until August. The transfer was made permanent on 28 July 2026.

== Personal life ==
His younger brother Timi Sobowale is also a professional footballer. The pair played together for the first time at senior level when Timi joined Waterford in 2022.

== Career statistics ==
As of match played 30 October 2026

Appearances and goals by club, season and competition
Club	Season	League			National Cup (Note: Includes FAI Cup, Copa del Rey, FA Cup & Scottish Cup)		League Cup (Note: Includes League of Ireland Cup, EFL Cup & Scottish League Cup)		Europe		Other		Total	
Club	Season	Division	Apps	Goals	Apps	Goals	Apps	Goals	Apps	Goals	Apps	Goals	Apps	Goals
Waterford	2016	LOI First Division	4	0	0	0	0	0	—		0	0	4	0
Waterford	2017	LOI First Division	1	0	0	0	0	0	—		1 (Note: Appearances in Munster Senior Cup)	0	2	0
Waterford	Total		5	0	0	0	0	0	—		1	0	6	0
Hércules	2017–18	Segunda División B	0	0	0	0	—		—		—		0	0
Finn Harps	2018	LOI First Division	7	1	2	0	0	0	—		1 (Note: Appearance in 2018 League of Ireland Promotion/Relegation Playoffs)	0	10	1
Waterford	2020	LOI Premier Division	13	0	1	0	—		—		—		14	0
Waterford	2021	LOI Premier Division	11	0	1	0	—		—		—		12	0
Waterford	2022	LOI First Division	24	3	4	0	—		—		4 (Note: Appearances in 2022 League of Ireland Promotion/Relegation Playoffs)	0	32	3
Waterford	2023	LOI First Division	19	1	—		—		—		1	0	20	1
Waterford	Total		67	4	6	0	0	0	—		5	0	71	4
Athlone Town (loan)	2021	LOI First Division	10	0	—		—		—		—		10	0
Shrewsbury Town	2023–24	League One	29	0	3	0	1	0	—		2 (Note: Appearances in EFL Trophy)	0	35	0
Swindon Town	2024–25	League Two	37	0	2	0	1	0	—		4	0	44	0
St Mirren	2025–26	Scottish Premiership	6	0	1	0	1	0	—		—		8	0
St Mirren	2026–27	Scottish Premiership	0	0	0	0	0	0	—		—		0	0
St Mirren	Total		6	0	1	0	1	0	—		0	0	8	0
Shamrock Rovers (loan)	2026	LOI Premier Division	23	1	1	0	—		3 (Note: Appearances in UEFA Champions League)	0	0	0	27	1
Shamrock Rovers	2026	LOI Premier Division	11	0	1	0	—		4 (Note: 2 appearances in UEFA Europa League; 2 appearances in UEFA Conference League)	0	—		16	0
Career total			195	6	16	0	3	0	7	0	13	0	234	6
