= 1969–70 Blaxnit Cup =

Tournament details
- Country: Northern Ireland; Republic of Ireland
- Teams: 8

Final positions
- Champions: Coleraine (2nd title)
- Runners-up: Sligo Rovers

Tournament statistics
- Matches played: 8
- Goals scored: 20 (2.5 per match)

The 1969–70 Blaxnit Cup was the 3rd edition of the Blaxnit Cup, an association football cup competition featuring teams from Northern Ireland and the Republic of Ireland.

Coleraine won the title for the 2nd time and 2nd consecutive season, defeating Sligo Rovers 4–2 on aggregate in the two-legged final.

== Results ==
=== Quarter-finals ===
Team 1	Score	Team 2
Bohemians	1–3	Derry City
Coleraine	2–0	Dundalk
Linfield	0–1	Cork Hibernians
Sligo Rovers	3–0	Ballymena United

=== Semi-finals ===
Team 1	Score	Team 2
Cork Hibernians	1–2	Coleraine
Derry City	0–1	Sligo Rovers

=== Final ===
19 May 1970

Coleraine	0–1	Sligo Rovers
	Report	Cooke 79'

Windsor Park, Belfast
Attendance: 4,000
Referee: W. A. O'Neill (Dublin)

22 May 1970

Sligo Rovers	1–4	Coleraine
Fagan 80'	Report	Dickson 50', 57', 67'; Mullan 60'

Dalymount Park, Dublin
Referee: H. Wilson (Belfast)

Coleraine win 4–2 on aggregate.
