= 1968–69 Top Four Cup =

Tournament details
- Country: Northern Ireland
- Teams: 4

Final positions
- Champions: Coleraine (1st title)
- Runners-up: Linfield

Tournament statistics
- Matches played: 3
- Goals scored: 7 (2.33 per match)

The 1968–69 Top Four Cup was the 4th and final edition of the Top Four Cup, a cup competition in Northern Irish football.

The tournament was won by Coleraine for the 1st time, defeating Linfield 1–0 in the final at The Oval.

== Results ==
=== Semi-finals ===
| Team 1 | Score | Team 2 |
|---|---|---|
| Coleraine | 5–0 | Derry City |
| Linfield | 1–0 | Glentoran |

=== Final ===
16 April 1969

| Coleraine | 1–0 | Linfield |
|---|---|---|
| Curley 35' | Report |

The Oval, Belfast
Attendance: 5,000
Referee: Malcolm Wright (Portadown)
