= 1973–74 Blaxnit Cup =

Tournament details
- Country: Northern Ireland; Republic of Ireland
- Teams: 8

Final positions
- Champions: Ards (1st title)
- Runners-up: Ballymena United

Tournament statistics
- Matches played: 7
- Goals scored: 30 (4.29 per match)

The 1973–74 Blaxnit Cup was the 7th and final edition of the Blaxnit Cup, an association football cup competition featuring teams from Northern Ireland and the Republic of Ireland.

Ards won the title for the 1st time, defeating Ballymena United 3–1 in the final.

== Results ==
=== Quarter-finals ===
| Team 1 | Score | Team 2 |
|---|---|---|
| Ards | 3–1 | Finn Harps |
| Ballymena United | 4–2 | Athlone Town |
| Drogheda United | 2–1 | Larne |
| St Patrick's Athletic | 1–2 | Glenavon |

=== Semi-finals ===
| Team 1 | Score | Team 2 |
|---|---|---|
| Ballymena United | 3–1 | Glenavon |
| Drogheda United | 3–3 (a.e.t.) (4–5 p) | Ards |

=== Final ===
7 May 1974

| Ards | 3–1 | Ballymena United |
|---|---|---|
| Cathcart 3'; McAteer 10'; Patterson 27' | Report | Orr 25' |

Windsor Park, Belfast
Referee: John Carpenter (Dublin)
