= Andy Bothwell =

Irish footballer

Personal information
- Full name: Andrew Wallace Bothwell
- Date of birth: 7 October 1900
- Place of birth: Belfast, Ireland
- Date of death: 4 February 1928 (aged 27)
- Place of death: Belfast, Northern Ireland
- Position: Outside right

Youth career
- Cregagh
- Mountpottinger

Senior career*
Years	Team	Apps	(Gls)
1921–1924	Willowfield		
1924–1925	Bangor		
1925–1928	Ards		

International career
1925–1927	Ireland	5	(0)
- * Club domestic league appearances and goals

Andrew Wallace Bothwell (7 October 1900 – 4 February 1928) was an Irish footballer who played for Cregagh, Mountpottinger, Willowfield, Bangor and Ards, as well as the Ireland national team, as an outside right.
