= 1965–66 Top Four Cup =

Tournament details
- Country: Northern Ireland
- Teams: 4

Final positions
- Champions: Derry City (1st title)
- Runners-up: Linfield

Tournament statistics
- Matches played: 4
- Goals scored: 12 (3 per match)

The 1965–66 Top Four Cup was the 1st edition of the Top Four Cup, a cup competition in Northern Irish football.

The tournament was won by Derry City for the first time, defeating Linfield 2–1 in the final at Solitude.

== Results ==
=== Semi-finals ===
Team 1	Score	Team 2
Derry City	3–1	Glentoran
Linfield	2–2	Ballymena United

==== Replay ====
Team 1	Score	Team 2
Linfield	1–0	Ballymena United

=== Final ===
6 May 1966

Derry City	2–1	Linfield
Parke 31'; Givens 49'		Scott 37'

Solitude, Belfast
