= 1973–74 Irish League =

Irish League
- Season: 1973–74
- Champions: Coleraine; 1st Irish title
- Matches played: 132
- Goals scored: 438 (3.32 per match)
- Top goalscorer: Des Dickson (24 goals)

Location of teams in the Irish League from 1972–75
Location of Belfast-based teams in the Irish League from 1972–75

The 1973–74 Irish League was the 73rd edition of the Irish League, the highest level of league competition in Northern Irish football. The league consisted of 12 teams, and Coleraine won the championship.

== League standings ==
Pos	Team	Pld	W	D	L	GF	GA	GR	Pts	Qualification
1	Coleraine (C)	22	16	3	3	41	20	2.050	35	Qualification for the European Cup first round
2	Portadown	22	13	4	5	51	20	2.550	30	Qualification for the UEFA Cup first round
3	Crusaders	22	14	2	6	48	32	1.500	30	
4	Linfield	22	10	6	6	46	25	1.840	26	
5	Glenavon	22	11	2	9	33	35	0.943	24	
6	Ballymena United	22	10	3	9	34	26	1.308	23	
7	Bangor	22	10	3	9	40	28	1.429	23	
8	Ards	22	9	4	9	42	37	1.135	22	Qualification for the European Cup Winners' Cup first round
9	Glentoran	22	8	2	12	28	39	0.718	18	
10	Larne	22	7	3	12	31	50	0.620	17	
11	Cliftonville	22	3	3	16	20	56	0.357	9	
12	Distillery	22	2	3	17	24	70	0.343	7	

Source: rsssf.com
(C) Champions

== Results ==
Home \ Away	ARD	BAN	BLM	CLI	COL	CRU	DIS	GLV	GLT	LRN	LIN	POR
Ards		2–1	1–0	4–1	2–2	3–4	3–1	3–2	3–0	4–3	2–2	0–1
Bangor	3–2		1–2	8–2	2–0	1–4	4–0	3–1	1–1	2–0	1–2	0–1
Ballymena United	1–0	1–2		2–2	1–3	1–0	6–0	0–1	1–2	2–0	1–0	1–1
Cliftonville	1–4	0–2	1–1		1–2	2–1	1–1	0–1	2–1	0–1	0–4	1–2
Coleraine	1–0	1–0	3–2	2–1		1–0	4–1	2–0	3–2	5–1	1–1	2–0
Crusaders	4–3	2–1	2–1	2–0	2–0		5–2	2–0	1–1	5–2	1–4	1–1
Distillery	1–1	0–4	1–5	2–3	0–1	0–2		2–3	3–0	1–4	1–1	1–6
Glenavon	1–0	1–0	0–1	2–1	1–2	1–3	4–2		2–1	3–1	1–1	0–0
Glentoran	1–0	0–1	0–2	1–0	0–2	0–3	4–2	4–0		2–3	3–2	1–0
Larne	2–2	1–1	1–0	2–0	1–3	1–3	0–1	4–3	1–3		0–0	1–7
Linfield	4–1	1–1	2–3	8–1	1–0	2–0	3–0	2–3	5–1	0–1		1–0
Portadown	1–2	4–1	3–0	3–0	1–1	5–1	6–2	1–3	2–0	3–1	3–0	

Source: Irish League Archive
Legend: Blue = home team win; Yellow = draw; Red = away team win.
