= Victor Hunter =

Northern Irish footballer

Victor Hunter (1937-July 2021) was a Northern Irish former footballer who played in the goalkeeping position. His clubs included Derry City FC and Coleraine FC, while he represented Northern Ireland both at 'B' and full international level. He won a 'B' cap in 1960 and later went on to win 2 full caps between 1961 and 1963. In 2017, Hunter was announced as Honorary Life Vice-President at Coleraine, at the club's 90th anniversary dinner. He later served as chief scout at Liverpool. He died in 2021.

His son, Barry, also represented Northern Ireland.
