= Jack McCandless (footballer) =

Irish footballer

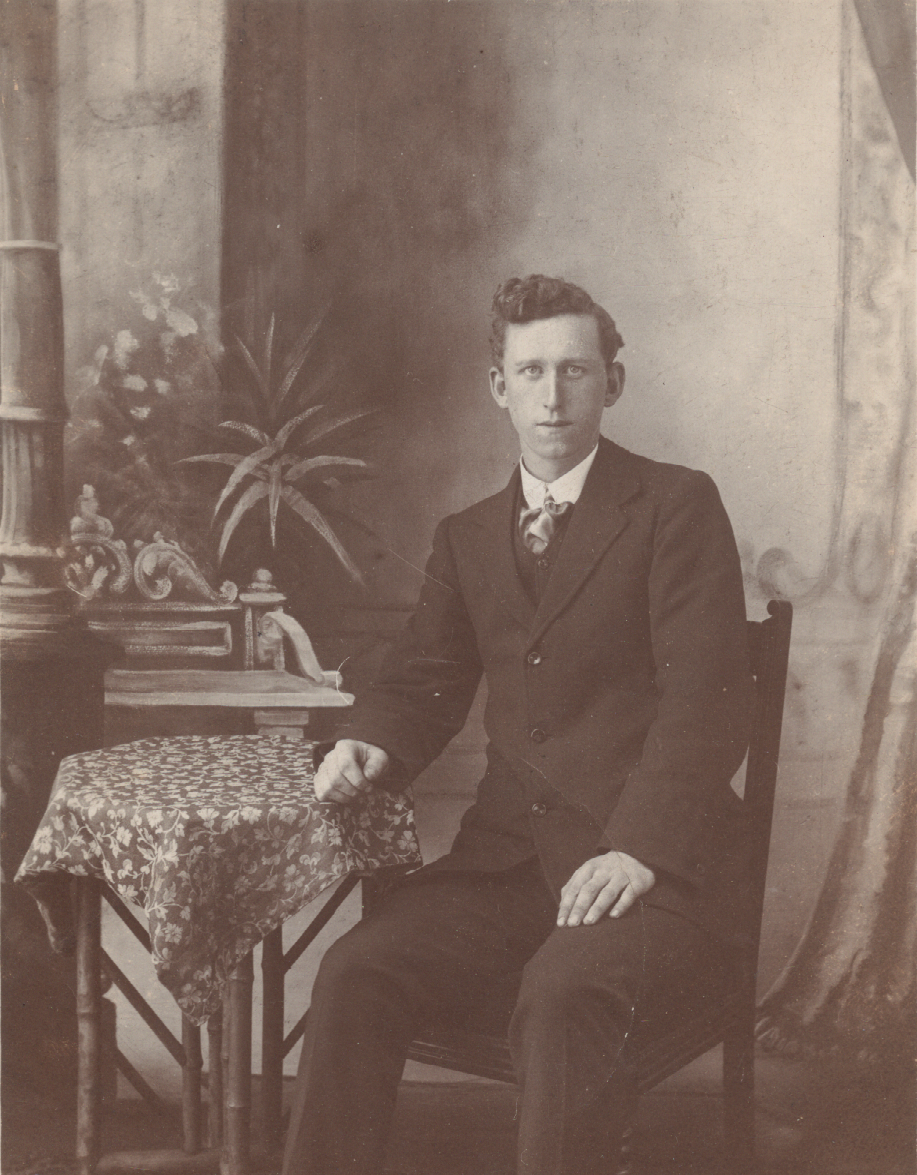
- Portrait of John McCandless

Personal information
- Full name: John McCandless
- Date of birth: 29 February 1892
- Place of birth: Coleraine, Ireland
- Date of death: 1940 (aged 47–48)
- Position: Winger

Senior career*
| Years | Team | Apps | (Gls) |
| 1910–1911 | Coleraine Alexandra | | |
| 1911 | Belfast Celtic | | |
| 1911 | Linfield | | |
| 1911–1923 | Bradford (Park Avenue) | 190 | (22) |
| 1917 | → Hibernian (loan) | | |
| 1918 | → Linfield (loan) | | |
| 1923–1924 | Accrington Stanley | 2 | (0) |
| 1923–1924 | Barn | | |
| 1924–1925 | Mid Rhondda United | | |
| 1925 | Lovell's Athletic | | |
| 1926 | Coleraine | | |
| Total | | 192 | (22) |

International career
| 1911–1920 | Ireland | 5 | (1) |
- * Club domestic league appearances and goals

John McCandless (29 February 1892–1940) was an Irish footballer who played in the Football League for Accrington Stanley and Bradford (Park Avenue). John would later go on to be one of the founders of and the first player manager for Coleraine F.C.
