= 1971–72 County Antrim Shield =

Tournament details
- Country: Northern Ireland
- Teams: 12

Final positions
- Champions: Ards (2nd win)
- Runners-up: Crusaders

Tournament statistics
- Matches played: 15
- Goals scored: 49 (3.27 per match)

The 1971–72 County Antrim Shield was the 83rd edition of the County Antrim Shield, a cup competition in Northern Irish football.

Ards won the tournament for the 2nd time, defeating Crusaders 5–4 on penalties after the two-legged final finished in a 3–3 draw on aggregate.

For this season and the following season only, the semi-finals and final were played as two legged matches.

== Results ==
=== First round ===
Team 1	Score	Team 2
Bangor	1–1	Dundela
Cliftonville	1–3	Chimney Corner
Glentoran	3–0	Linfield Swifts
Linfield	2–3	Larne
Ards	bye	
Ballymena United	bye	
Crusaders	bye	
Distillery	bye	

==== Replay ====
Team 1	Score	Team 2
Bangor	1–2	Dundela

=== Quarter-finals ===
Team 1	Score	Team 2
Ards	1–0	Glentoran
Ballymena United	2–0	Chimney Corner
Distillery	4–5	Crusaders
Larne	2–0	Dundela

=== Semi-finals ===
Teams that were at home in the first leg listed on the left.

Team 1	Agg.	Team 2	1st leg	2nd leg
Ballymena United	1–3	Ards	0–2	1–1
Larne	3–5	Crusaders	3–1	0–4

=== Final ===
8 May 1972

Ards	3–0	Crusaders
McCoy 37'; McCaughtry 71'; Patterson 82'	Report

Castlereagh Park, Newtownards
11 May 1972

Crusaders	3–0 (a.e.t.)	Ards
Finney 66'; McQuillan 86'; Beckett 90'	Report
Penalties
Finney (penalty scored); McQuillan (penalty scored); Calder (penalty scored); Beckett (penalty missed); Woods (penalty scored)	4–5	(penalty scored) McAvoy; (penalty scored) Patterson; (penalty scored) McCoy; (penalty scored) Humphries; (penalty scored) Nixon

Seaview, Belfast
Referee: Sam Patterson (Belfast)
