= Top Four Cup (Northern Ireland) =

- Organiser(s): Irish Football Association
- Founded: 1965
- Abolished: 1969
- Region: Northern Ireland
- Most championships: Linfield (2 titles)

The Top Four Cup was a football competition played between the top four clubs in the Irish League from 1965–66 to 1968–69. It was a knock-out competition, consisting of two semi-finals and a final.

== Final results ==
| Season | Date | Winner | Score | Runner-up | Venue |
|---|---|---|---|---|---|
| 1965–66 | 6 May 1966 | Derry City | 2 – 1 | Linfield | Solitude, Belfast |
| 1966–67 | 17 May 1967 | Linfield | 2 – 1 | Coleraine | Solitude, Belfast |
| 1967–68 | 16 May 1968 | Linfield | 1 – 1 (a.e.t.) | Coleraine | Solitude, Belfast |
| Replay | 30 May 1968 | Linfield | 3 – 1 | Coleraine | Solitude, Belfast |
| 1968–69 | 16 April 1969 | Coleraine | 1 – 0 | Linfield | The Oval, Belfast |

== Sources ==
- W.H.W. Platt (1986) A History of Derry City Football and Athletic Club 1929-1972.
- Bill Irwin (ed.) (1969) Irish Association Football Guide: Season 1969-70. Belfast: Century Newspapers Ltd
- Bill Irwin (ed.) (1968) Irish Association Football Guide: Season 1968-69. Belfast: Century Newspapers Ltd
- Bill Irwin (ed.) (1967) Irish Association Football Guide: Season 1967-68. Belfast: Century Newspapers Ltd
- Irish Football Club Project
