= 1993–94 County Antrim Shield =

Tournament details
- Country: Northern Ireland
- Teams: 16

Final positions
- Champions: Ards (3rd win)
- Runners-up: Crusaders

Tournament statistics
- Matches played: 15
- Goals scored: 45 (3 per match)

The 1993–94 County Antrim Shield was the 105th edition of the County Antrim Shield, a cup competition in Northern Irish football.

Ards won the tournament for the 3rd time, defeating Crusaders 4–2 in the final. For the 8th year running the County Antrim FA invited three clubs from County Armagh to compete (Glenavon, Newry Town and Portadown).

== Results ==
=== First round ===
Team 1	Score	Team 2
Ards	4–1	Glentoran
Ballymena United	1–1 (a.e.t.) (4–5 p)	Glenavon
Bangor	0–0 (a.e.t.) (4–2 p)	Cliftonville
Carrick Rangers	0–2	Ballyclare Comrades
Crusaders	4–3	Larne
Linfield	0–1	Distillery
Newry Town	3–1	Dundela
Portadown	3–0	RUC

=== Quarter-finals ===
Team 1	Score	Team 2
Crusaders	2–0	Ballyclare Comrades
Distillery	1–2 (a.e.t.)	Ards
Glenavon	2–0	Portadown
Newry Town	0–2	Bangor

=== Semi-finals ===
Team 1	Score	Team 2
Ards	2–1	Glenavon
Crusaders	3–2	Bangor

=== Final ===
1 February 1994

Ards	4–2	Crusaders
Brown 7'; Wilson 55'; Straney 80', 88'		Hunter 72'; Collins 84'

The Oval, Belfast
