= Timi Sobowale =

Irish footballer

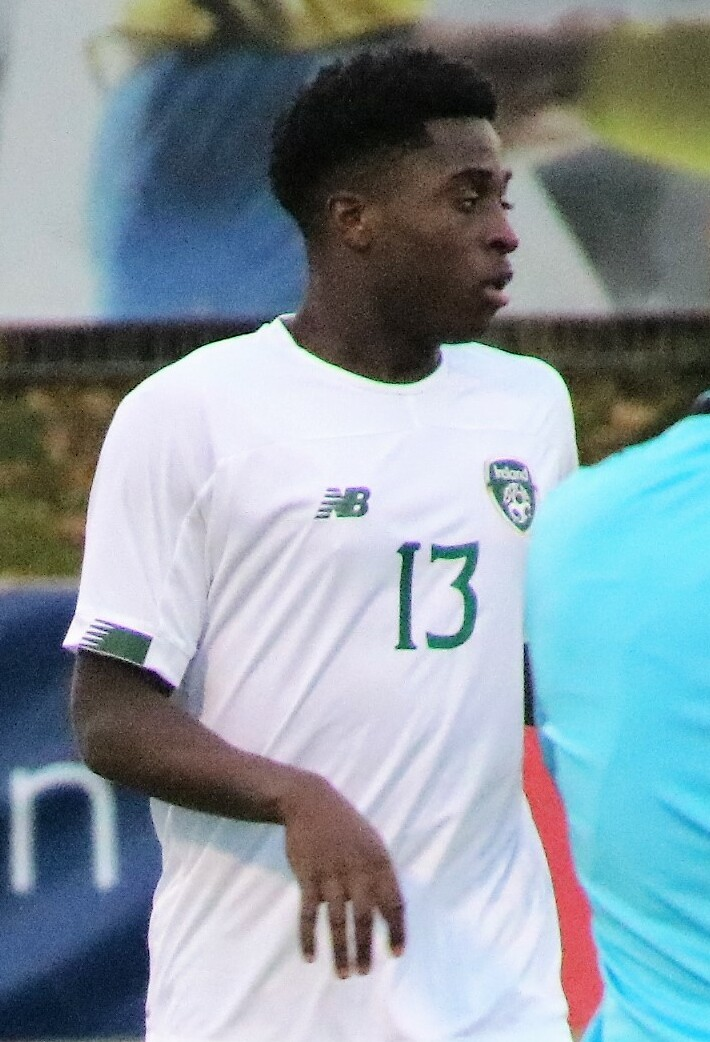
- Sobowale playing for the Republic of Ireland U19 team in 2019

Personal information
- Full name: Oluwatimilehin Sobowale
- Date of birth: 22 January 2002 (age 24)
- Place of birth: Dundalk, Ireland
- Height: 1.85 m (6 ft 1 in)
- Position: Defender

Team information
- Current team: Curzon Ashton

Youth career
- –2018: Villa FC
- 2018–2021: Manchester City

Senior career*
| Years | Team | Apps | (Gls) |
| 2021 | Real Monarchs | 10 | (0) |
| 2022 | Wigan Athletic | 0 | (0) |
| 2022 | Waterford | 4 | (0) |
| 2023 | Florø SK | 26 | (1) |
| 2024 | Nantwich Town | 7 | (0) |
| 2024– | Curzon Ashton | 0 | (0) |

International career^{‡}
| 2018–2019 | Republic of Ireland U17 | 9 | (1) |
| 2019 | Republic of Ireland U18 | 2 | (0) |
| 2019 | Republic of Ireland U19 | 2 | (0) |
| 2022 | Republic of Ireland U20 | 1 | (0) |
- * Club domestic league appearances and goals as of 13:50, 27 June 2024 (UTC) ‡ National team caps and goals as of 21:49, 29 March 2022 (UTC)

Oluwatimilehin Sobowale (born 22 January 2002) is an Irish professional footballer who plays as a defender, for Northern Premier League Premier Division club Curzon Ashton.

== Early life ==
Sobowale was born in Dundalk to Nigerian parents.

== Club career ==
=== Manchester City ===
In August 2018, Sobowale joined Manchester City from Waterford based side Villa FC.

=== Real Monarchs ===
On 10 May 2021, Sobowale signed with USL Championship side Real Monarchs. He made his professional debut on 9 June 2021, starting in a 2–0 win over Sacramento Republic.

=== Wigan Athletic ===
On 2 February 2022 Sobowale signed a short-term contract with Wigan Athletic, joining the under-23 side until the end of the 2021–22 season following a successful trial. He was released at the end of the season.

=== Waterford ===
On 1 September 2022, it was announced that Sobowale had signed for League of Ireland First Division side Waterford until the end of the season in November, where he would play alongside his brother Tunmise Sobowale for the first time.

=== Florø SK ===
In January 2023, Sobowale signed for Norwegian Third Division club Florø SK.

=== Return to England ===
In March 2024, Sobowale joined Northern Premier League West Division club Nantwich Town. In June 2024, he made the step up to National League North side Curzon Ashton.

== International career ==
Sobowale made seven starts in nine matches for Ireland U-17s, along with two appearances each for the U-18s and U-19s in 2019.

== Personal life ==
Timi's older brother Tunmise Sobowale is also a professional footballer. The pair played together on the same team for the first time at senior level when Timi signed for Waterford in 2022.
