= 2000 FAI Cup final =

- Event: 1999-2000 FAI Cup
Bohemians	Shelbourne
0 0	0 1
- Date: 30 April 2000 (first game); 5 May 2000 (replay)
- Venue: Tolka Park (first game); Dalymount Park (replay)
- Referee: J. Stacey (both games)

The 2000 FAI Cup final was the deciding match of the 1999-2000 FAI Cup, the national association football cup of Ireland. It was contested by Shelbourne and Bohemians, both of Dublin. The final went to a replay after the initial match, played at Tolka Park, finished 0–0. Shelbourne won the competition following a 1–0 victory in the replay to secure their first ever league and cup double.
