= Jamie McGonigle =

Northern Irish footballer

Personal information
- Full name: Jamie McGonigle
- Date of birth: 5 March 1996 (age 30)
- Place of birth: Derry, Northern Ireland
- Position: Striker

Team information
- Current team: Limavady United (on loan from Coleraine)

Youth career
- Dungiven Celtic

Senior career*
Years	Team	Apps	(Gls)
2014–2019	Coleraine	148	(65)
2019–2021	Crusaders	62	(32)
2021–2024	Derry City	76	(28)
2024–	Coleraine	61	(17)
2026	→ Sligo Rovers (loan)	4	(0)
2026–	→ Limavady United (loan)	0	(0)

International career
2017–2018	Northern Ireland U21	5	(0)
- * Club domestic league appearances and goals as of 12:29, 2 September 2026 (UTC)

Jamie McGonigle (born 5 March 1996) is a Northern Irish professional footballer who plays for NIFL Premiership side Limavady United, on loan from Coleraine.

Starting his career with Dungiven Celtic, McGonigle moved to Coleraine in 2015. After scoring 65 goals in 179 appearances, he signed for Crusaders in August 2019 for a Northern Irish transfer record fee of £60,000.

== Club career ==
=== Coleraine ===
McGonigle began his career playing in the lower leagues for hometown club Dungiven Celtic. After impressing, he moved to Coleraine in 2014, and after scoring 30 goals for the reserve team, made his debut for the senior team against Institute in January 2015.

By October 2017, he had scored against every club in the top flight, and his 16 league goals that season took Coleraine to second place in the league. He also helped the side to win the Irish Cup, playing in the 3–1 final victory over Cliftonville, and was named in the NIFL Team of the Year. He scored a total of 65 goals in 179 games for the Bannsiders.

=== Crusaders ===
McGonigle signed for Crusaders on 8 August 2019. The fee of £60,000 broke the Northern Irish transfer fee record, passing the previous record of £55,000 which had stood since Glenn Ferguson's transfer to Linfield from Glenavon in 1998. McGonigle scored his first goals by scoring five, including a hat-trick in less than three minutes, in an 8–1 victory over Sirocco Works on 10 September 2019.

=== Derry City ===
McGonigle then signed for Derry City on 29 June 2021 for a rumoured fee of £35,000. McGonigle made his Derry City debut in a 2–0 win over Waterford on 2 July 2021 at the Ryan McBride Brandywell Stadium. McGonigle netted his first goal for the club in a 3–0 win over Drogheda United a month later. He netted a crucial goal in a 2–1 win over Dundalk in the final game of the season which secured a 4th-place finish and European football for his side. Ahead of the 2022 season, McGonigle was handed the number 9 shirt. On 25 February 2022, McGonigle became the first Derry player since Alex Krstic in 1986 to score in 5 games in a row for Derry City in a 2–1 victory in injury time against Shamrock Rovers. On 18 March 2022, he signed a new contract with the club until the end of the 2025 season. McGonigle also bagged his first hat-trick for Derry in a 7–1 victory against UCD on 22 April 2022. He was named League of Ireland Player of the Month for April 2022 after scoring 5 goals in the month. On 2 January 2024, he was sold for an undisclosed fee, after scoring 28 goals in 92 appearances across all competitions during his time with the club.

=== Return to Coleraine ===
On 2 January 2024, McGonigle returned to his former club Coleraine Ona three-and-a-half year contract for an undisclosed fee.

==== Sligo Rovers loan ====
On 6 July 2026, he was loaned out to bottom of the table League of Ireland Premier Division club Sligo Rovers until the end of their season, with the goal of keeping them in the division through their relegation battle. On 1 September 2026, his loan deal was cut short after 6 appearances for the club.

==== Limavady United loan ====
On 1 September 2026, he signed for NIFL Premiership side Limavady United on a season-long loan.

== International career ==
McGonigle earned five caps for the Northern Ireland U21 side, having received his first call-up in 2017.

== Career statistics ==
As of match played on 15 August 2026

Appearances and goals by club, season and competition
Club	Season	League			National Cup		League Cup		Europe		Other		Total	
Club	Season	Division	Apps	Goals	Apps	Goals	Apps	Goals	Apps	Goals	Apps	Goals	Apps	Goals
Coleraine	2014–15	NIFL Premiership	7	3	0	0	0	0	—		—		7	3
Coleraine	2015–16	NIFL Premiership	37	7	1	0	2	0	—		—		40	7
Coleraine	2016–17	NIFL Premiership	34	15	4	3	3	1	—		—		41	19
Coleraine	2017–18	NIFL Premiership	36	16	4	2	1	1	2 (Note: Appearances in the UEFA Europa League)	0	1 (Note: Appearances in the NIFL Charity Shield)	0	44	20
Coleraine	2018–19	NIFL Premiership	34	12	4	2	1	2	2	0	—		40	16
Coleraine	Total		148	52	12	7	7	4	4	0	1	0	179	65
Crusaders	2019–20	NIFL Premiership	27	12	2	2	4	3	—		2 (Note: Appearances in County Antrim Shield)	5	35	22
Crusaders	2020–21	NIFL Premiership	35	10	3	0	—		—		0	0	38	10
Crusaders	Total		62	22	5	2	4	3	—		2	5	73	32
Derry City	2021	LOI Premier Division	17	8	1	0	—		—		—		18	8
Derry City	2022	LOI Premier Division	35	11	5	4	—		2 (Note: Appearances in the UEFA Europa Conference League)	0	—		42	15
Derry City	2023	LOI Premier Division	24	5	2	0	—		5	0	1 (Note: Appearances in the President of Ireland's Cup)	0	32	5
Derry City	Total		76	24	8	4	—		7	0	1	0	92	28
Coleraine	2023–24	NIFL Premiership	13	4	0	0	—		—		2 (Note: Appearances in the 2024 NIFL Premiership European Playoffs)	3	15	7
Coleraine	2024–25	NIFL Premiership	27	3	2	0	2	2	—		2 (Note: Appearances in the 2025 NIFL Premiership European Playoffs)	0	33	5
Coleraine	2025–26	NIFL Premiership	21	5	2	0	2	0	—		0	0	25	5
Coleraine	2026–27	NIFL Premiership	0	0	0	0	0	0	0	0	0	0	0	0
Coleraine	Total		61	12	4	0	4	2	0	0	4	3	73	17
Sligo Rovers (loan)	2026	LOI Premier Division	4	0	2	0	—		—		—		6	0
Limavady United (loan)	2026–27	NIFL Premiership	0	0	0	0	0	0	—		—		0	0
Career Total			351	110	29	11	11	6	11	0	8	8	423	142

== Honours ==
Coleraine

- Irish Cup (2): 2017–18, 2025–26

Derry City

- FAI Cup: 2022
- President of Ireland's Cup: 2023

=== Individual ===
- League of Ireland Player of the Month: April 2022
