= Blaxnit Cup =

- Organiser(s): Irish Football Association; Football Association of Ireland
- Founded: 1967
- Abolished: 1974
- Region: Northern Ireland; Republic of Ireland
- Teams: 8
- Most championships: Coleraine (2 titles)

The Blaxnit Cup is a defunct club football competition which featured teams from both football associations on the island of Ireland, in a similar format to the later Setanta Cup. It was inaugurated in 1967 as a cross-border competition between clubs from the League of Ireland from the Republic of Ireland and the Irish League from Northern Ireland and ran until 1974. The competition was sponsored by Blaxnit, a sock and hosiery manufacturer based in Newtownards.

The competition featured four teams from each league. The Blaxnit Cup was the third cross-border competition. Previous competitions included the Dublin and Belfast Intercity Cup 1941/42-1948/49 and the North-South Cup 1961/62-1962/63.

After the demise of the Blaxnit Cup teams from both sides of the border continued to compete in the Texaco Cup 1973/74-1974/75, the Tyler Cup 1978-1980 and after 2005 in the Setanta Sports Cup.

The tournament suffered from lack of interest and security concerns.

== List of finals ==
Finals played over two legs except 1973–74.

Season	Winner (number of titles)	Score	Runner-up	Venue
1967–68	(Republic of Ireland) Shamrock Rovers (1)	2 – 0	(Northern Ireland) Crusaders	Windsor Park, Belfast
1967–68	(Republic of Ireland) Shamrock Rovers (1)	1 – 2 (3 – 2 agg.)	(Northern Ireland) Crusaders	Dalymount Park, Dublin
1968–69	(Northern Ireland) Coleraine (1)	2 – 1	(Republic of Ireland) Shamrock Rovers	Windsor Park, Belfast
1968–69	(Northern Ireland) Coleraine (1)	2 – 2 (4 – 3 agg.)	(Republic of Ireland) Shamrock Rovers	Dalymount Park, Dublin
1969–70	(Northern Ireland) Coleraine (2)	0 – 1	(Republic of Ireland) Sligo Rovers	Windsor Park, Belfast
1969–70	(Northern Ireland) Coleraine (2)	4 – 1 (4 – 2 agg.)	(Republic of Ireland) Sligo Rovers	Dalymount Park, Dublin
1970–71	(Northern Ireland) Linfield (1)	1 – 1	(Republic of Ireland) Cork Hibernians	Windsor Park, Belfast
1970–71	(Northern Ireland) Linfield (1)	2 – 1 (3 – 2 agg.)	(Republic of Ireland) Cork Hibernians	Dalymount Park, Dublin
1971–72	(Republic of Ireland) Cork Hibernians (1)	3 – 2	(Northern Ireland) Coleraine	Flower Lodge, Cork
1971–72	(Republic of Ireland) Cork Hibernians (1)	2 – 1 (5 – 3 agg.)	(Northern Ireland) Coleraine	The Showgrounds, Coleraine
1972–73	(Northern Ireland) Glentoran (1)	1 – 1	(Republic of Ireland) Cork Hibernians	Flower Lodge, Cork
1972–73	(Northern Ireland) Glentoran (1)	5 – 1 (6 – 2 agg.)	(Republic of Ireland) Cork Hibernians	Castlereagh Park, Newtownards
1973–74	(Northern Ireland) Ards (1)	3 – 1	(Northern Ireland) Ballymena United	Windsor Park, Belfast
