= Movilla High School =

School in Newtownards, County Down, Northern Ireland

Location
- Donaghadee Road; Newtownards, County Down, BT23 7HA; Northern Ireland

Information
- Type: Controlled Secondary
- Motto: Learning today - Leading tomorrow
- Established: 1932; 94 years ago
- Status: Open
- Local authority: Education Authority
- Principal: Miss Dr Greer
- Gender: Co-Educational
- Age: 11 to 16
- Houses: Castle; Londonderry; Glen; Victoria
- Colour
- Website: https://www.movillahighschool.org/

Movilla High School is a controlled, co-educational, secondary school with a five form entry situated on the Donaghadee Road in Newtownards, Northern Ireland. Dr Caroline Greer is the principal.

== Pastoral structure ==
Each one of the school's pupils is assigned to one of the four Houses: Victoria, Londonderry, Castle or Glen. Pupils attend House assemblies, taken by the Head of House, wears a house ties and competes in various inter-house competitions which can be sporting or non-sporting.

== In the news ==
In October 2008, 25 teachers at the school went on strike over an incident of a pupil assaulting a member of the school's teaching staff.

== Notable alumni ==
- Martyn Irvine, professional cyclist, won gold at the 2013 UCI Track Cycling World Championships in the scratch race, and silver in the individual pursuit
