= Villa F.C. =

Villa FC
- Full name: Villa Football Club
- Nickname: The Villa
- Founded: July 1953; 73 years ago
- Ground: Connors Park
- Manager: Conor Coad
- League: FAI National League, Waterford & District Junior League
- Website: https://villafc.ie/
Home colours	Away colours

Villa Football Club is an Irish association football club based in Waterford, Ireland. Their senior men's team competes in the FAI National League and the Waterford & District Junior League.

The club have qualified for the FAI Cup on three occasions; in 2007, 2022 and 2024.

== History ==
Villa Football Club was founded in 1953 by ten men; Shamie Martin, Frank O'Byrne, Frank Farrell, Eddie Wall, Nicky Power, Sid Rellis, Michael Kiely, Billy Howlett, Eddie Wymberry and Eddie Smith. The club drew support from the Waterford city streets of Sexton Street, Leamy Street and Griffith Place, down as far as Morrison’s Road. Villa first appeared in a 5-a-side tournament in July 1953 and by September had entered two teams in the schoolboy leagues, at under-14 and under-15 level. The club's first league game was against Bolton in September 1953, which resulted in a 3–1 victory. In 1959, the club became the first Waterford side to win the Munster Youth Cup, then known as the Munster Minor Cup, when they beat Cork side Glasheen to win the 1958–59 trophy.

By 1962, the club had entered the Munster Senior League. Villa reached the Munster Junior Cup final in 1963, after a hat-trick from Buddy Purcell saw off the challenge of Limerick club Geraldines in the semi-final at Ozier Park. Due to an internal dispute within the Munster FA, the final of the competition didn't take place until 1964 when Villa lost out narrowly to Blackrock of Cork in Flower Lodge. The club also reached the quarter finals of the FAI Junior Cup in 1964 where they lost to Pike Rovers. Gene Roche, Buddy Purcell, Teddy Madigan and Frankie Mountain all represented Villa F.C. as part of the first Waterford Junior League representative team to win the Inter-league Oscar Traynor Cup in 1964. During this era, some of the club's players progressed to League of Ireland level, including Gene Roche, Ian Nolan, Billy Howlett, Ben Stokes, Sid Rellis, Al Casey, Pat Flynn, Frankie Mountain and Johnny Toms.

The next decade began with the capture of the Ardagh Cup in 1970, a cup competition for the leading sides in Waterford. Villa beat Waterford Bohemians 4–0 in the final, with goals from Teddy Robinson, Oxo Connors and a brace from Noel O'Neill. During the 1975–76 season, Villa started well and lost only once in their first eleven games. However, they finished the season behind Johnville F.C. and Waterford Bohemians. In 1978, the club leased the ground beside Ozier Park from the Waterford Junior League. Originally a dumping site, by 1980 it had been renovated into a football pitch, complete with a drainage system and dressing rooms. The ground was named Connors Park after former player, coach and secretary Eugene Connors, who died in 1983.

Although Villa won the Fitzgerald Youth Cup in 1982, the club would experience a downturn in fortunes during the rest of the decade. In 1985, Villa were relegated after more than twenty five years in the top flight of Waterford football. With two wins from 20 games, Villa failed to overtake Park Rangers who finished ahead of them by a solitary point.

The club began a rebuilding process in the 1990s, beginning by entering a team in the Fourth Division in 1991–92. While the team lost a play-off to win the division, the members of the side made significant contributions to the financing and overall running of the club. The team returned to win the Fourth Division in 1993–94 season, emulating the club's 1B team who also won their division that season. A further title followed in 1997 when the club won the 2A championship – losing just one of 20 games and beating Park Rangers in a final day 3–0 win. They lost on penalties to Abbeyside in the Infirmary Cup while trying to achieve the double. The introduction of a schoolboy academy during this period also increased participation numbers and the quality of coaches. The fruits of this labour began to show around the turn of the millennium and, beginning in the late 1990s, the facilities of the club underwent a radical improvement. The fundraising scheme, called "Villa 2000", saw the club generate enough capital to develop an artificial turf playing surface, erect security fencing and seed a new grass training area all by the turn of the century.

=== Modern era ===
By the 2020–21 season, Villa F.C. were competing in the top division of the Waterford & District Junior League. In 2022, the club won the competition for the first time. The club retained the title the following season. Villa FC also won the FAI Junior Cup in 2022, winning 1–0 in the final, as well as a number of other honours at levels from schoolboy to senior. Villa FC operates from their home ground at Connors Park in Poleberry, Waterford City. A number of former Villa FC players have gone on to success in football leagues outside Ireland, including Kenny McEvoy (Tottenham Hotspur), Lee O'Connor (Manchester United), Jayson Molumby (Brighton & Hove Albion), and Timi Sobowale (Manchester City).

In April 2022, Villa beat Inchicore Athletic to qualify for the first round of the FAI Cup.

=== FAI Junior Cup Win, 2022 ===
In 2022, Villa won the FAI Junior Cup, defeating Pike Rovers from Limerick at Turners Cross in Cork with the winning goal scored by Conor Kilgannon. Speaking of the win after the match, Villa manager Conor Coad noted that it was "a historic day for us and it's been a massive season for us, we've never won our own local Premier League and to go and do that recently and back it up with this win is something we could have only dreamed of at the start of the year".

The club also won the 2021–22 Waterford Junior League. They added two more league titles before the league transitioned to a calendar year schedule. Villa won the shortened league season in 2024 and went on to add the inaugural league trophy of the summer season in 2025.

== Current squad ==
As of 8 October 2026 players included in the club squad for the 2026 FAI National League season included:

Note: Flags indicate national team as defined under FIFA eligibility rules; some limited exceptions apply. Players may hold more than one non-FIFA nationality.

No.	Pos.	Nation	Player
1	GK	IRL	Craig Dunphy
2	DF	IRL	James Kennedy
3	DF	IRL	John Frederick Tamen
4	DF	IRL	Adam Conway
5	DF	IRL	Anthony Ebhonuaye
6	MF	IRL	Luke Walsh
7	MF	IRL	Conor Kilgannon
8	MF	IRL	Conor Whittle
9	FW	IRL	Dean Walsh
10	MF	IRL	Aaron O'Connor
11	MF	IRL	Shane O'Sullivan
12	DF	IRL	Killian Griffin

No.	Pos.	Nation	Player
13	MF	IRL	Danny Doyle
14	DF	IRL	Cian Browne
16	FW	IRL	Evan Ryan
17	MF	IRL	JP Browne
18	GK	IRL	Fabian Kerton
19	FW	IRL	Ed O'Dwyer
20	FW	IRL	Callum Flynn
22	MF	IRL	Daragh O'Connor
26	DF	USA	Dylan Stickel
23	FW	ZIM	Anderson Sipho Dube
33	FW	IRL	Regix Madika

== Notable former players ==
=== Republic of Ireland Senior Internationals ===
Note: Flags indicate national team as defined under FIFA eligibility rules; some limited exceptions apply. Players may hold more than one non-FIFA nationality.

No.	Pos.	Nation	Player
—	MF	IRL	Jayson Molumby (Plays as a midfielder for EFL Championship club West Bromwich Albion)
—	DF	IRL	Lee O'Connor (Plays as a defender for EFL League Two club Tranmere Rovers)

=== Republic of Ireland U21 Internationals ===
Note: Flags indicate national team as defined under FIFA eligibility rules; some limited exceptions apply. Players may hold more than one non-FIFA nationality.

No.	Pos.	Nation	Player
—	FW	IRL	Kenny McEvoy (Retired. Played for Tottenham Hotspur and other English league clubs.)
—	DF	IRL	Timi Sobowale (Plays as a defender, for English club Curzon Ashton)

== Honours ==
FAI Junior Cup

- Winners: 2021–22

All-Ireland President's Junior Cup

- Winners: 2022–23

Munster Youth Cup

- Winners: 1958–59, 2019–20

Waterford and District Junior League

- Premier League
  - Winners: 2021–22, 2022–23, 2023–24, 2024, 2025

Ardagh Premier Cup

- Winners: 1969–70, 1970–71, 2007–08
