= 2022 FAI Cup =

Tournament details
- Country: Republic of Ireland; Northern Ireland
- Venue(s): Aviva Stadium, Dublin
- Dates: 22 April – 13 November 2022
- Teams: 38 (all); 19 (qualifying round); 32 (main competition)

Final positions
- Champions: Derry City
- Runners-up: Shelbourne

Tournament statistics
- Matches played: 31
- Goals scored: 123 (3.97 per match)
- Top goal scorer: Enda Curran (6 goals)
- (Note: All statistics do not include qualifying round)

The 2022 FAI Cup is the 102nd edition of the Republic of Ireland's primary national cup competition. This edition features teams from the League of Ireland Premier Division and the First Division, as well as non-league teams. The competition began with qualifying on the week ending 22 April 2022.

The winners of the FAI Cup earns automatic qualification for the 2023–24 UEFA Europa Conference League.

== Teams ==
The FAI Cup is a knockout competition with 38 teams taking part. The competitors consisted of 19 teams from the Football League system (10 teams from the Premier Division and 9 from the First Division) plus 19 teams from the regional leagues (levels 3–7 of the Republic of Ireland football league system).

Round	Main date	Number of fixtures	Clubs remaining	New entries this round	Teams entering this round
Preliminary Round		6	38 → 32	12	12 Non-League teams
First Round		16	32 → 16	26	10 Premier Division teams, 9 First Division teams, 7 Non-League teams
Second Round		8	16 → 8	None	None
Quarter-Finals		4	8 → 4	None	None
Semi-Finals		2	4 → 2	None	None
Final		1	2 → 1	None	None

== Preliminary round ==
The six Preliminary Round ties began over the weekend of the 22 April with the First Round proper due to be played on 29–31 July. Seven non-league teams received byes into the First round: Bangor Celtic, Bonagee United, Cockhill Celtic, Lucan United, Malahide United, Maynooth University Town and Oliver Bond Celtic.

Leinster Senior League	Munster Senior League	Limerick & District League	Galway & District League	Waterford & District League
Bluebell United; Inchicore Athletic; Killester Donnycarney; Liffey Wanderers; St Francis; Usher Celtic	Carrigaline United; Everton AFC; Rockmount	Pike Rovers	Salthill Devon	Villa FC

22 April 2022	Usher Celtic (5)	1–0	St Francis (4)

23 April 2022	Villa FC (7)	2–0	Inchicore Athletic (5)	County Waterford
	Adam Heaslip; 56'; Dean Walsh; 87'	Report		Stadium: Ozier Park

24 April 2022	Killester Donnycarney (3)	2–0	Carrigaline United (3)

24 April 2022	Pike Rovers (7)	1–0	Everton AFC (4)

24 April 2022	Bluebell United (3)	3–1	Rockmount (3)

8 May 2022	Liffey Wanderers (3)	0–1	Salthill Devon (7)	Dublin, Ireland
		Report		Stadium: Irishtown Stadium

== First round ==
The draw for the First Round was made on 21 June 2022., consisting of the 6 winners from the previous round, all 19 members of the League of Ireland and seven teams who received byes from the preliminary round. The round included three teams from the seventh tier, the lowest-ranked teams remaining in the competition: Pike Rovers, Salthill Devon and Villa F.C.

League of Ireland Premier Division	League of Ireland First Division	Leinster Senior League	Ulster Senior League	Limerick & District League	Galway & District League	Waterford & District League
Bohemians; Derry City; Drogheda United; Dundalk; Finn Harps; St Patrick's Athletic; Shamrock Rovers; Shelbourne; Sligo Rovers; UCD	Athlone Town; Bray Wanderers; Cobh Ramblers; Cork City; Galway United; Longford Town; Treaty United; Waterford; Wexford	Bangor Celtic; Bluebell United; Killester Donnycarney; Lucan United; Malahide United; Maynooth University Town; Oliver Bond Celtic; Usher Celtic	Bonagee United; Cockhill Celtic	Pike Rovers	Salthill Devon	Villa FC

=== Matches ===
29 July 2022	Maynooth University Town (3)	2–1	Villa FC (7)	Maynooth, County Kildare
19:30	Sven Biansumba 53'; Jack O'Connor 78'	Report	James Kennedy 83'	Stadium: Maynooth University Astro

29 July 2022	Bray Wanderers (2)	0–3	Shelbourne (1)	Bray, County Wicklow
19:45		Report	Sean Boyd 5'; Sean Boyd 11'; Jack Moylan 66'	Stadium: Carlisle Grounds; Referee: Sean Grant

29 July 2022	Drogheda United (1)	5–1	Athlone Town (2)	Drogheda, County Louth
	Adam Foley 6'; Dean Williams 42'; Darragh Markey 45+1'; Dean Williams 55'; Ryan Brennan 68'	Report	Matthew McCarrick 84'	Stadium: United Park

29 July 2022	Dundalk (1)	4–0	Longford Town (2)	Dundalk, County Louth
19:45	Greg Sloggett 59'; Patrick Hoban 61'; Joe Adams 63'; Greg Sloggett 68'	Report		Stadium: Oriel Park; Attendance: 1,576; Referee: Alan Patchell

29 July 2022	Treaty United (2)	5–0	Usher Celtic (5)	Garryowen, County Limerick
19:45	Sean Guerins 6'; Dean George 48'; Dean George 61'; Enda Curran 70'; Success Edogun 90+3'	Report		Stadium: Markets Field; Referee: Robert Dowling

29 July 2022	UCD (1)	3–0	Cockhill Celtic (3)	Belfield, Dublin 4
19:45	Tommy Lonergan 30'; Tommy Lonergan 34'; Michael Gallagher 75'	Report		Stadium: UCD Bowl; Attendance: 200 (Est.); Referee: Paul Norton

29 July 2022	Bangor Celtic (3)	0–4	Shamrock Rovers (1)	Tallaght, Dublin 24
20:00		Report	Rory Gaffney 32'; Seán Hoare 66'; Aidomo Emakhu 74'; Daniel Cleary 82'	Stadium: Tallaght Stadium; Attendance: 1,730; Referee: Oliver Moran

29 July 2022	Finn Harps (1)	1–3	Bohemians (1)	Ballybofey, County Donegal
20:00	Eric McWoods 45+1'	Report	Declan McDaid 20'; Josh Kerr 43'; Junior Ogedi-Uzokwe 48'	Stadium: Finn Park; Referee: Rob Harvey

30 July 2022	Derry City (1)	7–0	Oliver Bond Celtic (6)	Derry, Northern Ireland
17:00	James Akintunde 8'; Declan Glass 25'; Declan Glass 28'; Declan Glass 40' (pen.); James Akintunde 62'; Mark Connolly 74'; Jamie McGonigle 86'	Report		Stadium: Ryan McBride Brandywell Stadium; Referee: Derek Tomney

30 July 2022	Lucan United (3)	3–0	Killester Donnycarney (3)	Celbridge, County Kildare
18:30	Josh Ukek 26'; Harry McEvoy 44'; Dave Mooney 58' (pen.); Glen Hollywood (red card) 85'	Report	Craig Giles (red card) 90'	Stadium: O'Hanlon Park

31 July 2022	Bonagee United (3)	6–0	Pike Rovers (7)	Letterkenny, County Donegal
14:00	Conor Black 15'; Michael Doherty 37'; Tony McNamee 41'; Tony McNamee 48'; Jamie Lynagh 65'; Conor Black 82'	Report	Steven McGann (red card) 32'	Stadium: Dry Arch Park

31 July 2022	Salthill Devon (7)	2–2 (a.e.t.) (5–6 p)	Malahide United (3)	Drom East, County Galway
14:00	Cillian Doyle 55'; Matthew Barrett 60'	Report	Jordi Ebanda 52'; Ciaran McGahan 90+5'	Stadium: Drom Soccer Park; Referee: Trevor Conlon
	Penalties
	TBC (penalty scored); TBC (penalty scored); TBC (penalty scored); TBC (penalty scored); TBC (penalty scored); Matthew Barrett (penalty missed)		TBC (penalty scored); TBC (penalty scored); TBC (penalty scored); TBC (penalty scored); TBC (penalty scored); TBC (penalty scored)

31 July 2022	Bluebell United (3)	0–7	Galway United (2)	Drumcondra, Dublin 3
15:00	Shane Stritch (red card) 11'	Report	David Hurley 9' (pen.); Stephen Walsh 32', 33'; Rob Manley 51'; David Tarmey 80'; Francely Lomboto 88', 90'	Stadium: Tolka Park; Attendance: 300 (Est.); Referee: Gavin Colfer

31 July 2022	St Patrick's Athletic (1)	2–3	Waterford (2)	Inchicore, Dublin 8
15:00	Ronan Coughlan 18' (pen.); Tom Grivosti 28'	Report	Wassim Aouachria 13'; Wassim Aouachria 33'; Junior Quitirna 42'	Stadium: Richmond Park; Attendance: 2,000 (Est.); Referee: Rob Hennessey

31 July 2022	Cobh Ramblers (2)	0–1	Cork City (2)	Cobh, County Cork
16:00		Report	Ruairí Keating 27'	Stadium: St Colman's Park; Attendance: St Colman's Park; Referee: Ray Matthews

31 July 2022	Sligo Rovers (1)	1–2 (a.e.t.)	Wexford (2)	Sligo Town, County Sligo
18:00	Aidan Keena 53' (pen.)	Report	Daniel Corcoran 80'; Ger Shortt 115'	Stadium: The Showgrounds; Referee: Damien McGraith

== Second round ==
The draw for the Second Round took place on 2 August 2022. Con Murphy hosted proceedings with former FAI Cup winners Alan Keane and Declan 'Fabio' O'Brien making the draw. The draw consisted of the 16 winners from the previous round: 7 teams from the Premier Division, 5 from First Division and 4 non-league outfits. The round included four teams from the third tier, the lowest-ranked teams remaining in the competition: Bonagee United, Lucan United, Malahide United and Maynooth University Town.

League of Ireland Premier Division	League of Ireland First Division	Leinster Senior League	Ulster Senior League
Bohemians; Derry City; Drogheda United; Dundalk; Shamrock Rovers; Shelbourne; UCD	Cork City; Galway United; Treaty United; Waterford; Wexford	Lucan United; Malahide United; Maynooth University Town	Bonagee United

26 August 2022	Derry City (1)	2–0	Cork City (2)	Derry, Northern Ireland
19:45	Will Patching 11' (pen.); Sadou Diallo 73'	Report	Ruairí Keating (red card) 51'	Stadium: Ryan McBride Brandywell Stadium; Attendance: 3,600 (Est.); Referee: Gavin Colfer

26 August 2022	Galway United (2)	2–3	UCD (1)	Galway City, County Galway
19:45	Mikie Rowe 44'; Max Hemmings 65'	Report	Tommy Lonergan 17'; Dylan Duffy 51'; Tommy Lonergan 87'	Stadium: Eamonn Deacy Park

26 August 2022	Lucan United (3)	0–2	Bohemians (1)	Phibsborough, Dublin 7
19:45	Anthony McKay (red card) 76'	Report	Liam Burt 32'; Jonathan Afolabi 34'	Stadium: Dalymount Park; Attendance: 3,000 (Est.); Referee: Kevin O'Sullivan

26 August 2022	Wexford (2)	2–3 (a.e.t.)	Dundalk (1)	Crossabeg, County Wexford
19:45	Luka Lovic 55'; Ger Shortt 66'	Report	David McMillan 38'; Ryan O'Kane 73'; Robbie Benson 109' (pen.)	Stadium: Ferrycarrig Park; Attendance: 567; Referee: Adriano Reale

26 August 2022	Bonagee United (3)	0–4	Shelbourne (1)	Letterkenny, County Donegal
20:00		Report	Josh Giurgi 45'; Daniel Carr 53'; Jack Moylan 60'; Daniel Carr 72'	Stadium: Dry Arch Park; Attendance: 1,000 (Est.)

27 August 2022	Malahide United (3)	0–6	Waterford (2)	Malahide, County Dublin
17:00		Report	Shane Griffin 7'; Roland Idowu 9'; Wassim Aouachria 13'; Phoenix Patterson 31'; Darragh Power 78'; Wassim Aouachria 90'	Stadium: Gannon Park; Referee: David Dunne

27 August 2022	Maynooth University Town (3)	0–3	Treaty United (2)	Clondalkin, Dublin 22
17:30		Report	Enda Curran 32'; Willie Armshaw 73'; Lee Devitt 83'	Stadium: John Hyland Park; Attendance: 220 (Est.); Referee: Alan Patchell

28 August 2022	Drogheda United (1)	1–2 (a.e.t.)	Shamrock Rovers (1)	Drogheda, County Louth
17:00	Dean Williams 58'	Report	Sean Gannon 4'; Andy Lyons 110'	Stadium: Head In The Game Park

== Quarter-final ==
The draw for the quarter final took place on 30 August 2022 and all ties were played the week ending Sunday 18 September 2022. The draw consisted of the 8 winners from the previous round: 6 teams from the Premier Division and 2 from First Division. The round included two teams from the second tier, the lowest-ranked teams remaining in the competition: Treaty United and Waterford.

League of Ireland Premier Division	League of Ireland First Division
Bohemians; Derry City; Dundalk; Shamrock Rovers; Shelbourne; UCD	Treaty United; Waterford

16 September 2022	Treaty United (2)	4–1	UCD (1)	Garryowen, County Limerick
19:45	Enda Curran 26' (pen.), 41', 50'; William Armshaw 76'	Report	Tommy Lonergan 80'	Stadium: Markets Field

16 September 2022	Waterford (2)	3–2	Dundalk (1)	Waterford City, County Waterford
19:45	Shane Griffin 31'; Darragh Power 43'; Phoenix Patterson 65'	Report	Paul Doyle 11'; Keith Ward 90+3'	Stadium: Waterford Regional Sports Centre; Referee: Neil Doyle

18 September 2022	Shelbourne (1)	3–0	Bohemians (1)	Drumcondra, Dublin 3
14:00	Jack Moylan 21'; Sean Boyd 39'; Sean Boyd 72'	Report		Stadium: Tolka Park

18 September 2022	Derry City (1)	3–1 (a.e.t.)	Shamrock Rovers (1)	Derry, Northern Ireland
17:00	Jamie McGonigle 19'; Daniel Lafferty 96'; Brandon Kavanagh 110'	Report	Lee Grace (red card) 38'; Rory Gaffney 66'	Stadium: Ryan McBride Brandywell Stadium

== Semi-final ==
The draw for the semi-final took place on 18 September 2022.

A total of 4 teams were in the semi-final draw: 2 teams from the Premier Division and 2 from First Division.

All ties were played on Sunday 16 October 2022.

League of Ireland Premier Division	League of Ireland First Division
Derry City; Shelbourne	Treaty United; Waterford

16 October 2022	Derry City (1)	2–1	Treaty United (2)	Derry, Northern Ireland
14:00	Jamie McGonigle 8'; Brandon Kavanagh 16'	Report	29' (pen.) Enda Curran	Stadium: Ryan McBride Brandywell Stadium; Referee: Neil Doyle

16 October 2022	Waterford (2)	0–1	Shelbourne (1)	Waterford City, County Waterford
16:45		Report	15' Gavin Molloy	Stadium: Waterford Regional Sports Centre; Referee: Robert Hennessy

== Final ==
13 November 2022	Derry City	4–0	Shelbourne	Dublin
15:00	Jamie McGonigle 18'; Cameron McJannet 35'; Cameron McJannet 61'; Jordan McEneff 90+2' (pen.)	Report		Stadium: Aviva Stadium; Attendance: 32,412; Referee: Damien McGrath
