= Ards F.C. =

Association football club in Northern Ireland

Ards
- Full name: Ards Football Club
- Nicknames: Red & Blue Army
- Founded: 1900; 126 years ago
- Ground: Clandeboye Park, Bangor; County Down
- Capacity: 2,000 (500 seated)
- Chairman: Warren Patton
- Manager: John Bailie
- League: NIFL Championship
- 2025–26: NIFL Championship, 8th of 12
Home colours	Away colours

Ards Football Club is a semi-professional, Northern Irish football club playing in NIFL Championship. The club is based in Newtownards, but plays its home matches at Clandeboye Park in Bangor, which it rents from rivals Bangor to play home games. The club colours are red and blue.

== History ==
=== Origins and development ===
Ards F.C. was founded in 1900. Originally operating as a factory team, the club entered the Irish League in 1923. Based at Castlereagh Park, the club won its first Irish Cup in 1927. After playing at intermediate level during World War II, Ards rejoined the league in 1947. Ards won its second Irish Cup in 1952. After winning the 1957–58 Irish League, the club qualified for a 1958–59 European Cup tie against Stade de Reims. The club won its third Irish Cup in 1969. While the club won several titles in the 1973–74 season and had further cup successes in the 1990s, mounting financial problems culminated in relegation and the proposed sale of Castlereagh Park in 1998.

=== Castlereagh Park ===
Ards were forced to sell their Castlereagh Park home in 1998 to try to reduce their debts. The stadium remained tended for another three years while plans for a new ground further down the road were developed. In 2002, Castlereagh Park was demolished as planned. Ards hoped to play at a new community-owned site, a short distance from Castlereagh Park that was due to be developed in 2010 by the local council. This plan was later shelved, and the club are still the "nomads" of Northern Irish football. During the time since Ards left Castlereagh Park, they have shared football grounds at Cliftonville's Solitude and Carrick Rangers' Taylors Avenue, their rivals Bangor's ground, Clandeboye Park and Ballyclare Comrades' ground, Dixon Park.

=== First top-flight return: 2013–14 ===
For the 2012–13 season they played their home games at Clandeboye Park and were promoted to the NIFL Premiership for the 2013–14 season and went straight back down that season. Ards 2014–15 season was a season of change, with many players coming and going from the club and the season ultimately ended in disappointment with them finishing 3rd. The 2015–16 was a better one with Ards reaching the league cup final by knocking out premiership sides Ballinamallard United and Coleraine before losing 3–0 in the final to Cliftonville at Solitude. Ards kept a comfortable hold at the top of the table before becoming league champions on the last day of the season beating Loughgall to secure their promotion back to the Premiership after a two-year absence.

=== Second top-flight return: 2016–17 ===
Amidst proposed new plans for a stadium to be built on the grounds of Movilla High School, Ards returned to the top-flight once more under the stewardship of Niall Currie, who sought to bolster his squad with no less than 15 new signings. These included experienced Premiership players such as Ballymena United centre-back Johnny Taylor, and former Glenavon striker Gary Liggett. Other recruitments included defender Stuart McMullan and French striker Guillaume Keke, both signed from Larne. Ards started the season with a credible 2–2 draw with Cliftonville and went on to win their next three games in a row to become early leaders at the top of the league table. Following Niall Currie's move to manage hometown club Portadown the club appointed Glentoran legend Colin Nixon as his replacement.

=== Londonderry Park ===
Plans were under-way to develop Londonderry Park as the new grounds for the team. Planning officials gave Ards Borough Council the go-ahead on the £3.8 million plan in October 2010.

In 2009, supporters launched a campaign, 'Bring Ards FC Home', in which they publicised the need in the media and had discussions with politicians. Back as far as November 2008, the Council had discussed the need for a new Ards stadium. It was decided in April 2009 that Londonderry Park, on the Portaferry Road in Newtownards, was the best option and the Ards Council accepted the tender for redevelopment of the site in September 2010. Plans included upgrades to the existing grass surfaces and the addition of new synthetic surfaces, and to allow for the possibility of future upgrading to meet regulations should the need arise. However, in August 2012, it was announced that Ards Borough Council would not be proceeding with the new stadium, and the plans were shelved.

=== 2020s ===
As of 2026, the club were playing home games at Bangor F.C.'s ground, Clandeboye Park.

== European record ==
=== Overview ===
Competition	Matches	W	D	L	GF	GA
European Cup	2	0	0	2	3	10
UEFA Cup	2	1	0	1	4	8
European Cup Winners' Cup	4	0	1	3	2	17
UEFA Intertoto Cup	4	0	0	4	1	14
TOTAL	12	1	1	10	10	49

=== Matches ===
Season	Competition	Round	Opponent	Home	Away	Aggregate
1958–59	European Cup	PR	(France) Stade Reims	1–4	2–6	3–10
1969–70	European Cup Winners' Cup	1R	(Italy) Roma	0–0	1–3	1–3
1973–74	UEFA Cup	1R	(Belgium) Standard Liège	3–2	1–6	4–8
1974–75	European Cup Winners' Cup	1R	(Netherlands) PSV Eindhoven	1–4	0–10	1–14
1997	UEFA Intertoto Cup	Group 3	(Belgium) Royal Antwerp	0–1	—N/a	5th
1997	UEFA Intertoto Cup	Group 3	(Cyprus) Nea Salamis	—N/a	1–4	5th
1997	UEFA Intertoto Cup	Group 3	(France) Auxerre	0–3	—N/a	5th
1997	UEFA Intertoto Cup	Group 3	(Switzerland) Lausanne Sports	—N/a	0–6	5th

== Boyle Sports Championship 2026/27 Current Standings ==
As of 21st November 2026

Ps.	Teams	MP.	W	D	L	GF	GA	GD	Pts.
1st	Glenavon	17	12	3	2	46	17	29	39
2nd	Annagh Utd	17	11	4	2	41	19	22	37
3rd	Newington	17	11	3	3	39	23	16	36
4th	Queen's University	17	8	2	7	32	22	10	26
5th	Newry City	17	7	5	5	26	25	1	26
6th	Institute	16	7	3	6	28	21	7	24
7th	Warrenpoint Town	16	6	4	6	24	25	-1	22
8th	Ballinamallard Utd	17	6	4	7	21	23	-2	22
9th	H&W Welders	17	7	1	9	24	27	-3	22
10th	Loughgall	17	5	6	6	22	32	-10	21
11th	Ards	17	5	5	7	17	21	-4	20
12th	Rathfriland Rangers	17	6	1	10	18	29	-11	19
13th	Moyola Park	17	5	3	9	19	32	-13	18
14th	Dundela	15	4	5	6	24	28	-4	18
15th	Armagh City	17	2	6	9	14	33	-19	12
16th	Strabane Athletic	17	2	5	10	13	31	-18	11

== Current squad ==
As of 10th November 2026

Number	Name	Nationality
1	Marc Matthews (GK)	Northern Irish
2	Connor Scannell	Northern Irish
3	Connor Maxwell	Northern Irish
4	Kielan Reid	Northern Irish
5	Ryan Arthur	Northern Irish
6	Steven Gordon	Northern Irish
7	Eamon Scannell (C)	Northern Irish
8	Patrick Cafolla	Northern Irish
10	Jack Smith	Northern Irish
11	Jaydyn Withers	Northern Irish
12	Caoimhan Crossan	Northern Irish
14	Ethan Simpson	Northern Irish
15	Jamie Browne	Northern Irish
16	George Tipton	Northern Irish
20	Cameron Kelly	Northern Irish
21	Ryan Bailie	Northern Irish
22	Fiontan O'Boyle	Northern Irish
23	James McClure (Loan)	Northern Irish
25	Conall Young	Northern Irish
29	Ben Mullen	Irish
32	James Taylor (GK)	Northern Irish
50	Michael Brammeld	Northern Irish

== Managerial history ==
Tenure	Manager
1935	Tom Adamson
1937–39	Sam Patton
1947–48	Ronnie Dellow
1949–50	Harry Walker
1950–51	John Reid
1951–53	Isaac McDowell
1953–59	George Eastham Sr.
1959	Jimmy Tucker
1959–60	Len Graham
1960–63	Tommy Ewing
1963–64	Johnny Neilson
1964–70	George Eastham Sr.
1970–78	Billy Humphries
1978–79	Joe Kincaid
1979–80	Billy Nixon
1980–82	Billy Humphries
1983–85	Lawrence Walker
1985–87	Jimmy Todd
1987	John Reaney
1988–89	Jimmy Todd
1989–90	Peter Dornan
1990–91	Bertie Mcminn
1991–92	Roy Coyle
1992–93	Paul Malone
1993–97	Roy Coyle
1997	George Bowden (Temporary)
1997–99	Tommy Cassidy
1999–01	Trevor Anderson
2001–03	Frankie Parks
2003–05	Shane Reddish
2005–06	George Neill
2006	Gary Hillis & Raymond Morrison
2006–10	Tommy Kincaid
2010–11	Justin McBride
2011–16	Niall Currie
2017–2019	Colin Nixon
2019	Warren Feeney
2019–2022	John Bailie
2022–2023	Matthew Tipton
2024-Present	John Bailie

== Honours ==
=== Senior honours ===
- Irish League (tier 1): 1
  - 1957–58
- Irish League First Division/Championship (tier 2): 3
  - 2000–01, 2012–13, 2015–16
- Irish Cup: 4
  - 1926–27, 1951–52, 1968–69, 1973–74
- Irish League Cup: 1
  - 1994–95
- County Antrim Shield: 3
  - 1955–56, 1971–72, 1993–94
- Gold Cup: 2
  - 1953–54, 1973–74
- Ulster Cup: 1
  - 1973–74
- Blaxnit Cup: 1
  - 1973–74

=== Intermediate honours ===
- Irish League B Division
  - 1957–58†
- Irish Intermediate Cup: 1
  - 1970–71†
- Steel & Sons Cup: 1
  - 2008–09
- George Wilson Cup: 2
  - 1957–58†, 1982–83†
- McElroy Cup: 1
  - 1940–41††

Clements Lyttle Cup

  - 1941-42, 1942-43††

† Won by Ards II †† Won by Ards playing as Ards II during war years

== International players ==
Number of caps listed are those gained whilst contracted to Ards FC.

- Andy Bothwell, 5 caps (Northern Ireland), 1925–27
- Tommy Forde, 4 caps (Northern Ireland), 1958–60
- Billy Humphries, 1 cap (Northern Ireland), 1962
- Paul Kee, 2 caps (Northern Ireland), 1994
