= Coleraine F.C. =

Association football club in Northern Ireland

Coleraine
- Full name: Coleraine Football Club
- Nickname: The Bannsiders
- Founded: June 1927; 99 years ago
- Ground: The Showgrounds, Coleraine
- Capacity: 4,843
- Owner: Bannsiders Holdings
- Chairman: Henry Ross
- Manager: Ruaidhrí Higgins
- League: NIFL Premiership
- 2025–26: NIFL Premiership, 2nd of 12
- Website: colerainefc.com
Home colours	Away colours

Coleraine Football Club is a Northern Irish football club, playing in the NIFL Premiership, the highest level of the Northern Ireland Football League.

The club, founded in 1927, hails from Coleraine, County Londonderry, and plays its home matches at The Showgrounds. Club colours are blue and white. The club won the Irish League title once (in 1973–74) and the Irish Cup on seven occasions, most recently in 2025–26. They are also the only Irish League club to have won two successive all-Ireland competitions, lifting the Blaxnit Cup in 1969 and 1970. The club share a rivalry with Ballymena United.

== History ==
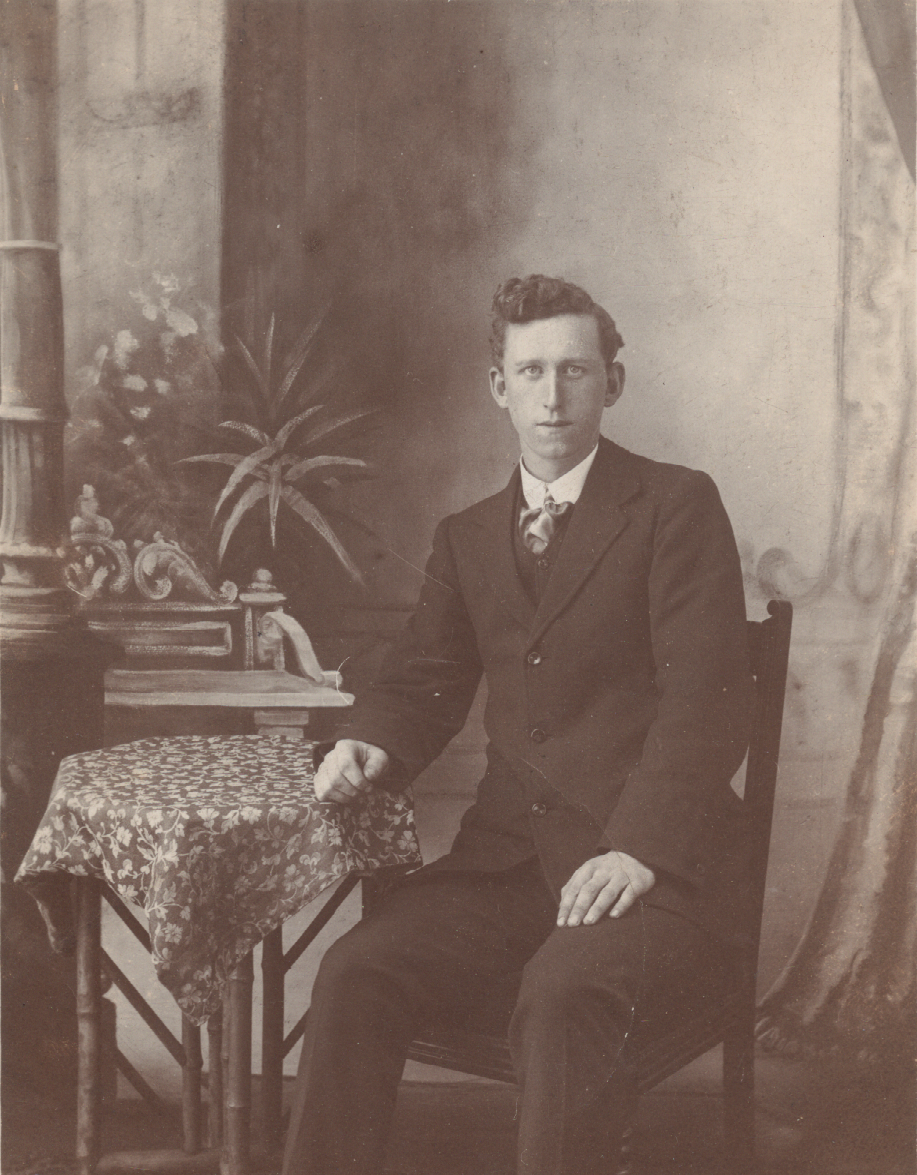
Portrait of John McCandless who was one of the original founders and first player / manager for Coleraine F.C.

The original Coleraine Football Club was founded in June 1927 originally called Coleraine FC at a meeting in the local Orange hall. The club was formed out of a merger between two local sides: Coleraine Olympic and Coleraine Alexandra with John McCandless being one of the founders and original player / manager for the club. The original club colours were all white, hence the club's original nickname – the Lilywhites. The club played its first competitive match on 20 August 1927, defeating Cliftonville 4–1. The club secured its first trophy in the 1931–32 season, defeating Ballymena United 3–0 at Solitude to win the Gold Cup, watched by a crowd of approximately 10,000. In the 1932–33 season, centre-forward Davy Pringle set a still-standing club record by scoring 59 goals, and Coleraine recorded their biggest ever league victory, defeating Portadown 11–1.

Among the early players to pass through the club was Peter Doherty, who had a trial at Coleraine in the 1930–31 season before moving on. Doherty went on to become one of the greatest footballers of his generation and later managed Northern Ireland to the quarter-finals of the 1958 FIFA World Cup.

In 1948, Coleraine reached its first Irish Cup final, going down 3–0 to Linfield. 1953 brought another appearance in the final and another defeat, again to Linfield, this time by five goals to nil. The 1950s saw the City Cup won for the first time (1953–54) and a second triumph in the Gold Cup (1958).

In 1961, chairman Jack Doherty persuaded Bertie Peacock to sign for Coleraine after he left Celtic. It would prove to be one of the most important transfers in the club's history. In 1965, Coleraine won the Irish Cup for the first time, defeating Glenavon 2–1 at Windsor Park, with goals from Shaun Dunlop and Derek Irwin. Coleraine thus gained its first experience of European football, against Soviet outfit Dynamo Kiev, becoming the first football club from the United Kingdom to play behind the Iron Curtain. Forward Tony Curley scored Coleraine's first ever goal in European competition, netting against Dynamo Kyiv on 2 September 1965. Coleraine also won the first two Blaxnit all-Ireland cups in 1969 and 1970. In the 1969–70 season, Des Dickson scored 55 goals, winning both the Golden Boot and the Football Writers' Player of the Year award. Coleraine also faced Kilmarnock in the 1970–71 Fairs Cup, and after a 1–1 draw in the first leg, the Bannsiders pulled off an historic 3–2 victory in Scotland thanks to a Des Dickson hat-trick.

In 1972, the Irish Cup was won again, this time by beating Portadown 2–1, with goals from Des Dickson and Ivan Murray. The Holy Grail of the Gibson Cup was finally captured in 1974. Under the management of Bertie Peacock, the squad consisting of the likes of Des Dickson, Johnny McCurdy, Ivan Murray, Michael Guy and Vince Magee clinched the title ahead of Portadown. Ivan Murray was named Football Writers' Player of the Year for the 1973–74 season. Bertie Peacock resigned in 1974 and Ivan Murray and Johnny McCurdy took over the reins. Murray continued as manager until 1978 and during his spell in charge the Irish Cup was won twice more – both times against Linfield. In 1975, it took three games before a goal from Jim "Chang" Smith in the second replay proved decisive. The 1977 victory was more emphatic with Liam Beckett, Des Dickson, Frankie Moffatt and Michael Guy scoring to give Coleraine a 4–1 victory. It was to be the club's last major trophy for 26 years.

In the 1980s there were two more cup finals, in 1982 and 1986, ending in defeats to Linfield and Glentoran respectively. The ground attendance record at The Showgrounds was set on 15 September 1982 when over 10,000 supporters watched a friendly against Tottenham Hotspur under newly installed floodlights. In the mid-1980s the club finished second in the Irish League for three successive seasons. Winger Ray McCoy was the standout player of the era, scoring 21 goals in the 1986–87 season to win both the Ulster Footballer of the Year and the Northern Ireland PFA Player of the Year awards, earning his only senior international cap. Steve Lomas, who would later captain Northern Ireland, made his debut for Coleraine aged 15 during this period. In the first part of the 1990s Coleraine struggled. In 1995 they dropped into the First Division. Under Kenny Shiels, Coleraine won the inaugural First Division title and in its first season back in the top flight, won the Ulster Cup and came agonisingly close to the title, being pipped late on by Crusaders.

After a poor start to the 1999–00 season, Shiels resigned and was replaced by Marty Quinn, who rallied the team to finish second in the league behind Linfield and reach the Irish Cup semi-finals and the Coca-Cola Cup final. The next 2 seasons saw Coleraine finish fourth both times – potential title challenges being ruined by inconsistency. In 2002–03, Coleraine ended the season in third place and reached their first Irish Cup Final since 1986. In the final, they faced Glentoran as massive underdogs as the east Belfast side were looking to complete a clean sweep of trophies. After an early strike from Gareth McAuley was harshly ruled out, Coleraine kept going and scored through Jody Tolan. Despite increasing Glentoran pressure, Coleraine held on and the trophy famine was over. The following season saw the club reach the Irish Cup final again, but this time it was Glentoran who emerged triumphant.

The club's well-publicised financial problems had already overshadowed much of the 2003–04 season (despite a substantial donation from Cold Feet actor and Coleraine fan James Nesbitt) and at its end the club was forced to operate on a reduced budget, with several top players leaving. Despite this a top six finish was still achieved. The summer of 2005 saw more budget cuts and several big names leaving the Showgrounds, but this time the main concern for fans was the very future of the club. In August, the Inland Revenue filed for a winding-up order against Coleraine due to debts of £1.3 million. The Friends of Coleraine, worked tirelessly to persuade the High Court to postpone the hearing to allow them to put together a business plan to show that the club could be viably run. The club were liquidated on 9 August 2006 after they were allowed to enter administration, and a steering committee was set up to run the new club Calver Holdings Ltd.

The club went on to defeat Institute to win the North West Senior Cup for the 1st time. The club were incredibly allowed to stay in the Premier League and survival was ensured on the pitch, the Friends of Coleraine formally took control of the club and appointed a new board. In 2008 the club reached the Irish Cup final, but lost 2–1 to Linfield. Manager Marty Quinn resigned after that game and his successor, former assistant David Platt, led Coleraine to a fifth-place finish in his first season in charge.

On 27 March 2010, Coleraine narrowly lost on penalties against Glentoran in the final of the Co-Operative Insurance Cup. They also lost out to Linfield in the semi-finals of the Irish Cup. Despite possessing the two top goalscorers in the league, including 41 goal Rory Patterson, Coleraine could only finish the season in seventh. Despite the arrival of much-travelled English striker Leon Knight, inconsistent form throughout the first half of the 2010–11 season resulted in manager David Platt being sacked at the start of February. His replacement, Oran Kearney revitalised a struggling team and they climbed the table rapidly, again ending up seventh.

An overhaul of the squad over the summer saw Kearney put his mark on the club and the improvement shown in his first four months in charge then continued, with Coleraine performing well in the league and reaching the final of the IRN-BRU League Cup.

In 2012–13 Coleraine finished the season in 6th place after making the split five games previously.

In the 2015–16 season, after many average seasons, the Bannsiders hit title winning form, going on a winning run with it being halted after a while by Linfield. They started to fall away after that result, being knocked out of the Irish Cup by 3–1 by Portadown and finished in 5th place and lost the Europa League Play-off by 2–1 to Glentoran.

The 2016–2017 was a fairly good one for the Bannsiders with them currently sitting an impressive 3rd in the table and they also booked their place in the 2017 Irish Cup Final by beating Glenavon 2–1 to reach their first final in nine years, where they lost 3–0 to the double winners Linfield.

At the start of the 2017/18 season 'The Bannsiders' made a few new signings. Josh Carson, who came from Linfield originally playing for York City and Ipswich Town, signed for Coleraine as well as Aaron Traynor and Stephen O'Donnell from Warrenpoint Town and Institute respectively. They started their pre-season off well by beating Bangor City 3–1. They were then defeated in the Europa League first round qualifier by Haugesund from Norway. During the 2017/18 season, the Bannsiders went on an amazing run, losing once only to Linfield in the NIFL Premiership, finally finishing in second place, two points behind Crusaders. Although Coleraine did not attain the title, a sixth Irish Cup triumph was secured when they defeated Cliftonville in the final of that competition in May, thanks to the heroics of starlet Aaron Burns.

Oran Kearney left the club to take over at SPFL Premiership side St. Mirren in September 2018, and was replaced by Dungannon Swifts manager Rodney McAree, who guided Coleraine to a sixth-place finish and an Irish Cup semi-final. Following a failure to win the Europa League playoffs, McAree was sacked on 10 May 2019, having only been in charge for eight months. Kearney departed St. Mirren via mutual agreement to rejoin Coleraine as manager on 3 July 2019, citing family reasons as the main reason for leaving the Scottish side. Kearney settled back into his role as manager of Coleraine for a second spell. The summer transfer window of 19/20 caused some controversy with Kearney selling star striker Jamie McGonigle to Crusaders for £50,000, while Aaron Burns was also allowed to leave for free. Despite losing two key players, Coleraine started the season well, recording notable victories over reigning Champions and runners ups, Linfield and Ballymena respectively. With the club involved in a five way title race, the club opted to bolster their squad in the January window with the signing of Nixon from Carrick Rangers. In February 2020, Coleraine beat Crusaders 2–1 in the Bet McLean League Cup final to win the first major trophy of the season, with another two still up for grabs. Coleraine were second four points behind Linfield and in an Irish Cup semi-final until the season was stopped due to the COVID-19 pandemic. Coleraine still qualified for the 2020 UEFA Europa League Qualifiers and were drawn against Slovenian champions NK Maribor, who played the likes of Chelsea and Sevilla in the UEFA Champions League a few years previous. Despite being massive underdogs, Coleraine won the game on penalties, sending them through to the second qualifying round, having defeated La Fiorita in the round previous to Maribor. The Bannsiders were drawn at home to SPFL Premiership side Motherwell and having been 2–0 down at half time, brought the game back to 2-2 and managed to hold 10-man Motherwell off until penalties, but the Scottish side progressed through thanks to goalkeeper Trevor Carson's heroics in the penalty shootout.

In the 2020–21 season, Coleraine once again demonstrated their competitive edge by securing a commendable second place in the NIFL Premiership. The following season saw them make a notable run to the League Cup final, narrowly missing out on the trophy. Despite facing stiff competition, they maintained a solid sixth-place finish in the 2021-22 league campaign, reflecting their consistency on the pitch.

Oran Kearney's side continued to perform steadily in the 2022–23 season, securing another sixth-placed finish in the league. Their appearance in another League Cup final highlighted their ongoing commitment to success, further solidifying their standing in Northern Irish football.

In the summer of 2024, Coleraine restructured their management setup: Oran Kearney, who had managed the club across two spells spanning over a decade, moved into a Sporting Director role, with Dean Shiels appointed as Head Coach. Shiels had previously served as a player and coach at The Showgrounds. Coleraine finished the 2024–25 NIFL Premiership season in fifth place with 55 points.

In May 2025, Ruaidhrí Higgins was appointed as manager, returning to the club where he had ended his playing career in 2016. Higgins had previously managed Derry City, guiding them to the 2022 FAI Cup and the 2023 President's Cup. The appointment proved transformative: in the 2025–26 Irish Cup, Coleraine defeated Dungannon Swifts 3–2 in the final on 3 May 2026 to claim the club's seventh Irish Cup title, becoming the first club from outside Belfast to lift the trophy since their own 2018 triumph. Coleraine operate as a full-time professional club, and Higgins has developed a high-tempo, attacking style of play that has drawn widespread attention within Irish League football. The club also runs an extensive youth academy programme, providing a pathway from grassroots football through to the senior squad and supporting player development across the Causeway Coast and Glens area.

== Ground ==
Coleraine play their home matches at The Showgrounds, which has a capacity of 4,843. The ground's principal covered stand is the Jack Doherty Grandstand. The Railway End is an uncovered terrace at the opposite end. Away supporters enter via Hillman's Way (Gate H).

== Supporters ==
Coleraine FC has an independent supporter organisation, the Friends of Coleraine Football Club, which was established in 2006. The organisation formerly held ownership of the club before selling its interest to private investors in 2024.

== Club records ==
=== Individual records ===
- Des Dickson is the club's all-time leading scorer, having netted 452 goals in his career at Coleraine. In the 1969–70 season he scored 55 goals, winning both the Golden Boot and the Football Writers' Player of the Year award.
- Johnny McCurdy made the most appearances for the club, playing 660 times for Coleraine.
- Jay Riley became Coleraine's youngest ever player when he made his debut in September 2019, aged 14 years and 8 months.
- Tony Cochrane became the club's most expensive departure when he transferred to Burnley in 1976 for approximately £250,000 in combined fees across two moves, with a subsequent transfer to Middlesbrough in 1978.

=== Attendance record ===
- The ground record attendance at The Showgrounds is over 10,000, set on 15 September 1982 when Coleraine hosted Tottenham Hotspur in a friendly match.

== European record ==
=== Overview ===
Competition	Matches	W	D	L	GF	GA
European Cup	2	0	0	2	1	11
Inter-Cities Fairs Cup / UEFA Cup / UEFA Europa League	29	4	8	17	28	72
UEFA Europa Conference League	2	0	0	2	2	4
European Cup Winners' Cup	8	0	1	7	7	34
UEFA Intertoto Cup	4	1	1	2	9	6
TOTAL	45	5	10	30	47	127

=== Matches ===
Season	Competition	Round	Opponent	Home	Away	Aggregate
1965–66	European Cup Winners' Cup	1R	(Soviet Union) Dynamo Kyiv	1–6	0–4	1–10
1969–70	Inter-Cities Fairs Cup	1R	(Luxembourg) Jeunesse Esch	4–0	2–3	6–3
1969–70	Inter-Cities Fairs Cup	2R	(Belgium) Anderlecht	3–7	1–6	4–13
1970–71	Inter-Cities Fairs Cup	1R	(Scotland) Kilmarnock	1–1	3–2	4–3
1970–71	Inter-Cities Fairs Cup	2R	(Netherlands) Sparta Rotterdam	1–2	0–2	1–4
1974–75	European Cup	1R	(Netherlands) Feyenoord	1–4	0–7	1–11
1975–76	European Cup Winners' Cup	1R	(West Germany) Eintracht Frankfurt	2–6	1–5	3–11
1977–78	European Cup Winners' Cup	1R	(East Germany) Lokomotive Leipzig	1–4	2–2	3–6
1982–83	European Cup Winners' Cup	1R	(England) Tottenham Hotspur	0–3	0–4	0–7
1983–84	UEFA Cup	1R	(Netherlands) Sparta Rotterdam	1–1	0–4	1–5
1985–86	UEFA Cup	1R	(East Germany) FC Leipzig	1–1	0–5	1–6
1986–87	UEFA Cup	1R	(East Germany) Stahl Brandenburg	1–1	0–1	1–2
1987–88	UEFA Cup	1R	(Scotland) Dundee United	0–1	1–3	1–4
1997–98	UEFA Cup	1QR	(Switzerland) Grasshoppers	1–7	0–3	1–10
2000–01	UEFA Cup	QR	(Sweden) Örgryte	1–2	0–1	1–3
2002	UEFA Intertoto Cup	1R	(Andorra) Sant Julià	5–0	2–2	7–2
2002	UEFA Intertoto Cup	2R	(France) Troyes	1–2	1–2	2–4
2003–04	UEFA Cup	QR	(Portugal) União de Leiria	2–1	0–5	2–6
2017–18	UEFA Europa League	1QR	(Norway) Haugesund	0–0	0–7	0–7
2018–19	UEFA Europa League	1QR	(Serbia) FK Spartak Subotica	0–2	1–1	1–3
2020–21	UEFA Europa League	PR	(San Marino) La Fiorita	1–0	—N/a	—N/a
2020–21	UEFA Europa League	1QR	(Slovenia) Maribor	—N/a	1–1 (5–4 p)	—N/a
2020–21	UEFA Europa League	2QR	(Scotland) Motherwell	2–2 (0–3 p)	—N/a	—N/a
2021–22	UEFA Europa Conference League	1QR	(Bosnia and Herzegovina) Velež Mostar	1–2	1–2	2–4
2026–27	UEFA Conference League	2QR	(Finland) HJK	0–3	0–5	0–8

=== UEFA ranking ===
As of 25 April 2023

Rank	Team	Points
362	(Kazakhstan) Shakhter Karagandy	2.500
363	(Iceland) FH	2.500
364	(Northern Ireland) Coleraine	2.500
365	(North Macedonia) Sileks	2.500
366	(Faroe Islands) NSÍ Runavík	2.500

== Current squad ==
Note: Flags indicate national team as defined under FIFA eligibility rules; some limited exceptions apply. Players may hold more than one non-FIFA nationality.

No.	Pos.	Nation	Player
1	GK	ENG	Ryan Schofield
2	DF	NIR	Lyndon Kane
3	DF	NIR	Dean Jarvis
4	DF	NIR	Dylan Boyle
5	DF	NIR	Cameron Stewart
6	DF	ENG	Kodi Lyons-Foster
7	FW	SCO	Lewis McGregor
8	MF	ENG	Will Patching
9	FW	NIR	Matthew Shevlin
10	MF	SCO	Connor Murray
11	FW	NIR	Joel Cooper
12	GK	WAL	Lewis Webb

No.	Pos.	Nation	Player
14	MF	IRL	Mark Coyle
15	DF	NIR	Levi Ives
16	DF	SCO	Aidan Wilson
17	MF	SCO	Jay Henderson
20	MF	NIR	Senan Devine
21	MF	ENG	Rowan McDonald
22	MF	NIR	Ben Wylie
24	FW	NIR	Conor McMenamin
25	FW	ENG	James Akintunde
26	DF	ENG	Conrad Hunt (On loan from Watford u21s)
28	MF	NIR	Oliver Devlin
—	MF	NIR	Ben Doherty

=== On Loan ===
Note: Flags indicate national team as defined under FIFA eligibility rules; some limited exceptions apply. Players may hold more than one non-FIFA nationality.

No.	Pos.	Nation	Player
19	FW	NIR	Jamie McGonigle (On loan at Sligo Rovers until 1st January 2027)
28	MF	NIR	Tiernan Brolly (On loan at Institute until 1st July 2027)
66	MF	NIR	Alfie Gaston (On loan at Limavady United until 1st July 2027)

== Non-playing staff ==
- President: Hugh Wade
- Honorary vice president: Frankie Moffatt, Hunter McClelland, Nevin Oliver
- Executive chairman: Henry Ross
- Board of directors:Rob Helle, Niall McGill, Henry Ross, Chris Fillis
- Club secretary: Paul Vance
- Sporting director: vacant
- Assistant head coach: vacant
- Head of goalkeeping: Michael Doherty
- Head of medical: George Dennison
- Head of performance: Junior Mendes
- Club doctor: Dr Peter Reid
- Kit man: Ricky Purcell
- Physiotherapists: Alan Millar & Ciaran Ferris
- Senior academy director: Ollie Mullan
- Junior Academy Director: David Platt
- Women's manager: Gareth Scott

== Managerial history ==
- (Northern Ireland) Ruaidhrí Higgins (2 May 2025 – present)
- (Northern Ireland) Dean Shiels (1 Jun 2024 – 30 Apr 2025)
- (Northern Ireland) Oran Kearney (2nd Spell) (3 Jul 2019 – 1 Jun 2024)
- (Northern Ireland) Rodney McAree (14 Sep 2018 – 10 May 2019)
- (Northern Ireland) Oran Kearney (8 Feb 2011 – 6 Sep 2018)
- (Northern Ireland) Aidy McLaughlin (interim) (30 Jan 2011 – 5 Feb 2011)
- (Northern Ireland) David Platt (27 Jun 2008 – 1 Feb 2011)
- (Northern Ireland) Marty Quinn (6 Nov 1999 – 3 May 2008)
- (Northern Ireland) Tony Curley/Wes Lamont (interim) (23 Oct 1999 – 30 Oct 1999)
- (Northern Ireland) Kenny Shiels (26 Dec 1994 – 16 Oct 1999)
- (Northern Ireland) Felix Healy (9 Oct 1993 – 3 Dec 1994)
- (Northern Ireland) Tony Curley (interim) (10 Dec 1994 – 17 Dec 1994)
- (Scotland) Billy Silnclair (5 Dec 1992 – 2 Oct 1993)
- David Keery (interim) (31 Oct 1992 – 28 Nov 1992)
- (Northern Ireland) Colin O'Neill (27 Jul 1992 – 24 Oct 1992)
- (Northern Ireland) Victor Hunter (interim) (18 Feb 1992/ – 25 Apr 1992)
- (Northern Ireland) Iam McFaul (17 Aug 1990 – 23 Jan 1992)
- (Northern Ireland) Frankie Moffatt (interim) (14 Apr 1990 – 28 Apr 1990)
- (Northern Ireland) Jim Platt (18 Aug 1984 – 6 Apr 1990)
- (Northern Ireland) Tony Curley (15 Jan 1983 – 24 Apr 1984)
- (Northern Ireland) Des Dickson (30 Jul 1981 – 8 Jan 1983)
- (Northern Ireland) Victor Hunter (28 Jul 78 – 20 Apr 1981)
- (Northern Ireland) Ivan Murray (10 Aug 1974 – 29 Apr 1975)
- (Northern Ireland) Ivan Murray/Johnny McCurdy (11 Aug 1975 – 22 Apr 1978)
- (Northern Ireland) Bertie Peacock (5 Aug 1961 – 9 May 1974)
- Kevin Doherty (18 Aug 1956 – 29 Apr 1961)
- (Scotland) Peter McKennan (21 Aug 1954 – 18 May 1956)
- Vacant (16 Jan 1954 – 14 May 1954)
- (Scotland) Willie Buchan (15 Aug 1953 – 9 Jan 1954)
- Vacant (14 March 1950 – 13 May 1953)
- (Scotland) Arthur Milne (19 Aug 1950 – 7 March 1953)
- Vacant (21 Jan 1950 – 19 May 1950)
- Albert Mitchell (3 Dec 1949 – 14 Jan 1950)
- (Scotland) Isaac McDowell (21 Sep 1946 – 4 Sep 1948)
- Davie Reid (24 Aug 1946 – 3 Sep 1946)
- Sammy Walker (18 Aug 1945 – 1 Jun 1946)
- (Northern Ireland) Ben Clarke (23 Dec 1939 – 13 Apr 1940)
- Vacant (2 Dec 1939 – 16 Dec 1939)
- Frank Green (19 Aug 1939 – 29 Nov 1939)
- Tommy Edwards (20 Aug 1938 – 29 Apr 1939)
- Vacant (15 Aug 1936 – 30 Apr 1938)
- (Northern Ireland) John McCandless Jack McCandless (footballer) (2nd Spell) (17 Aug 1935 – 25 Apr 1936)
- (Northern Ireland) Johnny Scraggs (18 Aug 1934 – 27 Apr 1935)
- (Scotland) Willie McStay (25 Nov 1933 – 2 May 1934)
- Vacant (21 Aug 1933 – 18 Nov 1933)
- (Northern Ireland) John McCandless Jack McCandless (footballer) (20 Aug 1927 – 4 May 1933)

== Honours ==
=== Senior honours ===
- Irish League: 1
  - 1973–74
- Irish Cup: 7
  - 1964–65, 1971–72, 1974–75, 1976–77, 2002–03, 2017–18, 2025–26
- Northern Ireland Football League Cup: 2
  - 1987–88, 2019–20
- City Cup: 2
  - 1953–54, 1968–69
- Gold Cup: 4
  - 1931–32, 1958–59, 1969–70, 1975–76
- Ulster Cup: 8
  - 1965–66, 1968–69, 1969–70, 1972–73, 1975–76, 1985–86, 1986–87, 1996–97
- Top Four Cup
  - 1968–69
- North West Senior Cup: 23
  - 1952–53†, 1954–55, 1955–56, 1957–58 (shared), 1958–59, 1960–61, 1964–65, 1966–67, 1967–68, 1969–70, 1981–82, 1982–83, 1987–88, 1988–89, 1991–92, 1994–95, 2001–02, 2003–04, 2005–06, 2007–08, 2009–10, 2012–13, 2024-25
- Irish League First Division: 1
  - 1995–96
- Blaxnit Cup: 2
  - 1968–69, 1969–70
- Irish News Cup: 1
  - 1995–96

† Won by Coleraine Reserves

=== Intermediate honours ===
- Irish Intermediate Cup: 2
  - 1964–65†, 1968–69†
- George Wilson Cup: 4
  - 1954–55†, 1985–86†, 1991–92†, 1995–96†
- Craig Memorial Cup: 3
  - 1984–85†, 1986–87†, 2013–14†
- NIFL Premiership Development League: 1
  - 2023-24†

† Won by Coleraine Reserves

== Allegations of sectarianism ==
The club has long been associated with the Protestant / loyalist side of the community and in 2024 the club was reported to the IFA league for playing sectarian songs in their social club. An investigation suggested fans were also chanting anti-Catholic slogans.

In 2022 it was reported that Coleraine supporters had teamed up with an English football hooligan firm to provoke violence ahead of a game against the predominantly Catholic supporters of Cliftonville club.

== Women's team ==
Coleraine F.C. operates a women's football programme, with teams competing in the NIWFA league structure. The club fields sides at multiple levels, including Division 2 and Division 7, reflecting a growing participation in the women's game. The women's section holds an annual end-of-season awards evening to recognise player achievements. As of 2025, the women's manager is Gareth Scott.
